= List of figures in Germanic heroic legend, D–E =

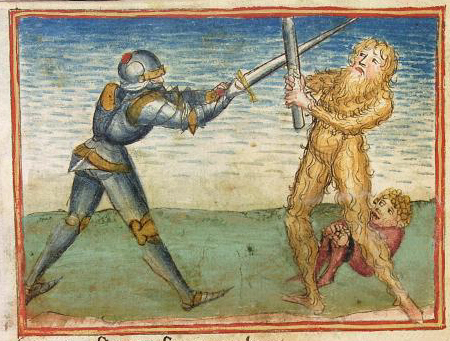
Dietrich von Bern fights a wild man before encountering the giant Sigenot. Illimunation from Cod. Pal. germ. 67, fol. 19r, produced c. 1470 for Margaret of Savoy.

== D ==
Figure	Names in medieval languages	Historical origin	Name meaning	Relationships	Early and English Attestations	Norse Attestations	German Attestations
Dag	Old Norse: Dagr		The name means "day" from PGmc *daʒaz.	In the Eddic poem Helgakvíða Hundingsbana II, Dag was the son of Högni^{3} and the brother of Sigrún and Bragi. When Helgi Hundingsbane fought for the hand of Sigrún against her suitor Hothbrodd and her family, only Dag was spared and made to swear allegiance to the Völsungs. As Dag was obliged by honour to avenge his father, he sacrificed to Odin and the god lent him his spear. Dag found Helgi in the Grove of fetters (probably the sacred grove of the Semnones mentioned by Tacitus) and pierced him with the spear. He went to his sister to inform her about it and she put a curse on him.		Helgakvíða Hundingsbana II	
Dag the Great	Old Norse: Dagr inn ríki	Probably Snorri's addition.	For the etymology of Dagr, see Dag above.	In the Ynglinga saga, Dag the Great is the father of Dageiðr, who together with Alaric, the king of Sweden, had the son Alf^{1}. Dag's descendants were called the Daglings (dǫglingar). In Snorri's source Ynglingatal 8, dǫglingar ("descendant of Dag") appears and in Ynglingatal 11, Dags frændr ("Dag's kinsmen") but Elias Wessén comments that this probably refers to Dag the Wise an earlier king of Sweden, and Snorri's inclusion of a second king named Dag appears unmotivated.		Ynglingatal 20, Ynglinga saga 8, 11	
Dag the Wise	Old Norse: Dagr Spaka		For the etymology of Dagr, see Dag the Great above.	Dag the Wise was an early Swedish king who was the son of Dyggve and the father of Alaric and Eric. The Historia Norwegiæ reports that he died fighting against Danes wanting to avenge his tame sparrow. Ynglingatal and Ynglinga saga add that the king had the ability to speak with the sparrow. In Ynglinga saga, it was killed in Reidgotaland and the king found out where by sacrificing a boar. However, when invading and avenging his sparrow in Gotland (sic.), he was killed by a thrall who threw a pitchfork at him.		Ynglingatal (VIII), Historia Norwegiæ, Íslendingabók, Ynglinga saga (18)	
Dæghrefn	Middle High German: Dæghrefn		The name means "day raven" from PGmc *daʒaz ("day") and *χrabnaz ("raven").	Beowulf mentions the Frankish warrior Dæghrefn before he is going to slay the dragon. During Hygelac's historic raid into Frisia, Dæghrefn appears to have killed Hygelac and Beowulf avenges him by crushing Dæghrefn to death with his bare hands. He also saves Hygelac's necklace from being taken to the Frisian lord. Dæghrefn has a "characteristically Frankish" name.	Beowulf		
Dankwart	Middle High German: Dancwart		First element from PGmc *þank, related to OHG dankjan ("to think"), second element PGmc *wardu ("guardian").	Hagen/Högni^{1}'s younger brother. He is killed by Helferich. He appears along with Hagen in several other epics.			Nibelungenlied, Nibelungenklage, Dietrichs Flucht, Rosengarten zu Worms
Diether	Middle High German: Diethêr, Old Norse: Þether	Possibly a mixture of Theodoric the Great's brother Theodemund and his nephew Theodahad (died 536).	First element PGmc *þeudo- (people), second *hari- ("host, army").	Son of Dietmar, brother of Dietrich von Bern, nephew of Ermanaric, cousin of the Harlungen. He is killed by Witige, along with the sons of Attila and Helche.			Þiðreks saga, Dietrichs Flucht, Rabenschlacht
Dietleib von Steier	Middle High German: Dietleip von Stîre, Old Norse: Þetleifr		First element PGmc *þeudo- ("people"), second element OHG leiba ("remnant").	Son of Biterolf. In Biterolf und Dietleib, he leaves his home at Toledo, Spain, to seek his father who is serving Attila. They briefly fight when they are both incognito. He is known as "von Steier" (of Styria) because Attila grants his father Styria as a fief. In Laurin, his sister Künhilt has been abducted by the dwarf king Laurin and he subsequently aids her in escaping. In the Þiðreks saga, his father is Danish and his mother Saxon, and he is an unpromising youth until he saves his father's life. He joins Dietrich von Bern's men. Eventually, he is killed by queen Ostacia in the form of a dragon.			Þiðreks saga, Dietrichs Flucht, Rabenschlacht, Biterolf und Dietleib, Rosengarten zu Worms, Laurin, Virginal
Dietlind^{1}	Middle High German: Dietlint, Old Norse: Oda	She may have her basis in Theodelinda (dead c. 628).	First element PGmc *þeudo- ("people"), the second element is *linthia meaning "soft, flexible", but possibly also "snake" or "dragon".	The mother of Dietleib.			Þiðreks saga, Biterolf und Dietleib
Dietlind^{2}	Middle High German: Dietlint		See Dietlind^{1}	The daughter of Rüdiger; she is betrothed to Giselher. She has a dream telling her of her father's death, and Dietrich von Bern, her uncle, promises to find her a husband.			Nibelungenlied, Nibelungenklage
Dietmar	Old Norse: Þjóðmar or Þetmarr, Middle High German: Dietmâr	Historical Ostrogothic king Theodemir (died 475)	First element PGmc *þeudo- ("people"), second -māri ("famous").	Father of Dietrich von Bern and Diether, brother of Ermanaric, uncle of the Harlungen.		Mentioned as Þjóðrekr's father in Guðrúnarkviða III.	Þiðreks saga, Dietrichs Flucht, Heldenbuch-Prosa
Dietrich von Bern	Old High German: Deotrîch, Old English: Þēodrīc, Old Norse: Þjóðrekr or Þiðrekr, Middle High German: Dietrîch	The Ostrogothic king Theodoric the Great (454–526).	"People-ruler", from PGmc *þeudo- ("people") and PGmc *rīk- ("ruler, powerful").	Son of Dietmar, brother of Diether, nephew of Ermanaric. Dietrich's exile is first mentioned in the Hildebrandslied. In Old English sources, it is mentioned that Dietrich spent thirty years at Maeringa burg, and that he gave a sword to Witege for aiding him against giants. In the Nibelungenlied, he appears as an exile at Attila's court. All of his men are killed in the fighting with the Burgundians except Hildebrand^{1}. In the Nibelungenklage, he organizes the burial of the dead and then sets out with his wife Herrat and Hildebrand^{1} to reclaim his kingdom. In Dietrichs Flucht, his uncle Ermanaric forces Dietrich into exile from his kingdom in Lombardy. Dietrich wins three Pyrrhic victories but each time is unable to reclaim his kingdom. In Rabenschlacht, Dietrich's brother Diether and the sons of Attila are killed; Rüdiger arranges for him to be reconciled with Attila. In other epics, Dietrich arranges a great tournament against the Burgundians and Siegfried, and fights against various supernatural beings, including being captured by giants. In the Þiðreks saga, Dietrich's youthful adventures, exile, and return to his kingdom are recounted, as well as his death riding an infernal horse that carries him to hell. References in the Eddic poems to Dietrich are fairly late.	Deor, Waldere	Guðrúnarkviða II, Guðrúnarkviða III	Hildebrandslied, Annals of Quedlinburg, Nibelungenlied, Nibelungenklage, Þiðreks saga, Dietrichs Flucht, Rabenschlacht, Alpharts Tod, Rosengarten zu Worms, Eckenlied, Sigenot, Goldemar, Dietrich und Fasolt, Laurin, Virginal, Wunderer, Ermenrichs Tod, Heldenbuch-Prosa
Dietrich von Griechen	Middle High German: Dietrîch von Kriechen, possibly Old Norse: Þiðrekr Valdemarsson	Theodoric Strabo has been suggested as the origin of this figure.	See Dietrich von Bern.	In the German sources, one of Attila's vassals and Dietrich von Bern's companion. He is possibly the same figure as Thidrek Valdemarsson in the Þiðreks saga.			Dietrichs Flucht, Rabenschacht, Rosengarten zu Worms. Possibly in Þiðreks saga.
Dietwart	Middle High German: Dietwart	Probably an invention of the poet or redactor of Dietrichs Flucht.	First element PGmc *þeudo- ("people"), the second element is PGmc *warda- ("protector, guardian").	An ancestor of Dietrich von Bern's and an ideal prince. He kills a dragon during his bridal quest to marry Minne ("love").			Dietrichs Flucht
Domalde	Old Norse: Dómaldi or Dómaldr, Latin: Domald or Domaldus		It is the same name as Frankish Domald/Domuald and Old High German Tuomwald. The first element is dómr from PGmc *dōmaz ("judgment"). The second element -valdi is a variant of -valdr and they are from PGmc *waldaz ("ruler").	The oldest source Ynglingatal only reports that the Swedes sacrificed their king Domaldi in the hope of having better harvests. Snorri adds in Ynglinga saga that during a famine, the Swedes sacrificed oxen the first year, and people the second year. The third year they sacrificed their king. The Historia Norwegiæ says that the Swedes sacrificed him to Ceres which was probably Interpretatio Romana for the goddess Freyja. A similar sacrifice is reported to have been performed as early as the 4th c. by the Burgundians, and as late as the 1527 c. the Swedish king Gustav Vasa complained that his subjects considered him responsible for the harvests.		Ynglingatal (V), Historia Norwegiæ, Íslendingabók, Ynglinga saga (15)	
Domar	Old Norse: Dómarr, Latin: Domar		The PN form of the name was *dōmaharjaʀ. It is the same name as Visigothic Domarius and Old English Domhere . The first element is dómr from PGmc *dōmaz ("judgment"). The second element is -harjaz ("war chief", "warrior").	Domarr was an early Swedish king who succeeded his father Domaldi and who was the father of Dyggve. After the sacrifice of his father for good harvests, he had a prosperous and peaceful reign and died of illness at Uppsala. He was burned at the Fýrisvellir on the bank of the river Fyris and standing stones were raised after him.		Ynglingatal (VI), Historia Norwegiæ, Íslendingabók, Ynglinga saga (16)	
Drasian	Middle High German: Drasîân, Old Norse: Drusian	Connections to the Gepid king Thrafstila or the Roman general Drusus have been suggested, but George Gillespie finds these suggestions "[s]omewhat bizarre".	The first element of the name is PGmc *þrasa ("quick" or "threaten"), the ending -îân is frequent in the names of characters who are heathens, giants, and dwarfs.	In Wolfdietrich, Drasian abducts Wolfdietrich's wife and is subsequently killed by him. In Þiðreks saga, the widow of Drasian sends Ecke out to find Dietrich von Bern, and Dietrich marries one of his daughters.			Wolfdietrich, Þiðreks saga
The Dragon (Beowulf)	Old English: wyrm and Old English: draca		Wyrm is from PGmc *wurmaz or *wurmiz meaning "snake", while draca is from Latin dracō ("dragon").	In Beowulf, a slave accidentally awakes a dragon in a barrow that is guarding a treasure (2212), which is a typical trait for Scandinavian dragons, and it flies by night and sets things ablaze (2272ff). The dragon was upset because he had protected the treasure for three centuries, and a slave steals a cup from him. It is more than 50 feet long (3042), spews fire (2308f, 2313) and has fangs (2692), but it is probably the poisonous breath (2839) that kills the hero Beowulf. It is snake like and coils like one (2561, 2567–2569), and it moves quickly (2288). It is covered with scales (2273), and bone (2578), but its belly was softer (2699). It appears to be lizard-like but it flies (2315, 2830, 2832f). The imagery recalls a dragon seen on a shield from Sutton Hoo. During the fight, Beowulf hits it with his sword Nægling, but it breaks, and the dragon bites him in the neck with his fangs wounding him mortally (2691f). Wiglaf attacks the dragon's belly, and Beowulf gets the chance to use his dagger on the dragons belly and kill it.	Beowulf		
Drasolf	Old Norse: Drasolfr		The first element is PGmc *thrasa- ("to fight", "to move fast"), the second element is PGmc *wulfa- ("wolf").	Drasolf is married to Sigmund's sister Signy^{2}. He attacks the Poles, and Sigmund supports him, leaving Sigmund's wife Sisibe (Hjördis/Sieglinde) in the hands of Sigmund's unscrupulous advisors. Drasolf's campaign against Poland is successful.			Þiðreks saga
Drífa^{1}	Old Norse: Drífa		The name means "snowdrift"	Snorri tells in Ynglinga saga that she was the daughter of Snær ("snow") in Lappland. One winter Vanlandi, the king of Sweden, stayed with them and married her promising to return for her after three years. However, after ten years he had still not returned. Humiliated Drífa^{1} sent their son Vísburr to Uppsala (where the Swedish king resided) accompanied by a witch named Hulð, whom she had paid to transport Vanlandi to Lappland with magic, or kill him. The magic caused Vanlandi to want to go Lappland, but his advisors made him stay. Instead Hulð had him hag ridden to death.		Ynglinga saga (13)	
Drífa^{2}	Old Norse: Drífa		See Drífa^{1}	In Hrólfs saga kraka, the daughter of Hrólfr kraki who marries her off to Bödvar Bjarki, and she thus replaces Hrut (Freawaru) in the saga. She and her sister Skur also appear in the Skjöldunga saga, as the daughters of Hrólfr.		Skjöldunga saga, Hrólfs saga kraka	
Durinn	Old Norse: Durinn		If the first vowel was long it means "the sleepy one", but if it was short "door-keeper". It may also be connected to Old Indic dhvaras, a "demonic being".	According to the U version of the Hervarar saga, the king Svafrlami was out hunting and he found a big stone and the dwarves Dvalinn and Durinn. He held them captive with the steel of his sword so they could not return to the stone. As he knew they were the most skilled smiths among the dwarves, he commanded them to forge the best sword for him with hilt and grip of gold. It would never rust or fail and pierce iron like cloth, and always make its master victorious. The dwarves did as commanded and forged Tyrfing, but they cursed it so it would cause Svafrlami's death, do three evil deeds and be the death of a man every time it was drawn.		Hervarar saga (U version), Vǫluspá, Gylfaginning	
Dvalinn	Old Norse: Dvalinn		The name means the "slow one" or the "sleeping one".	See Durinn for his role in Hervarar saga. According to Fáfnismál, Dvalinn was the father of several norns, and according to Sǫrla þáttr he was one of the four dwarves who forged Freyja's necklace Brisingamen.		Sǫrla þáttr, Hervarar saga (U version), Völsunga saga, Vǫluspá, Hávamál, Alvíssmál, Gylfaginning, Fáfnismál	
Dyggve	Old Norse: Dyggvi, Latin: Dyggui and Dygvius		The name is related to the adjective dyggr which means "trusty" and "valiant".	Dyggvi was an early king of Sweden who was the son of Domar and the father of Dag the Wise. Snorri reports that like his father he ruled until he died of illness. Snorri adds that his mother was Drótt, the daughter of Danpr, the son of Rig (the god Heimdall). His wife's brother was Danr inn mikilláti, after whom the Danes were named. He also adds that Dyggvi was the first ruler to be called "king" in Old Norse. The account of his death as related by Ynglingatal is notable because of its sexualized content. It tells Dyggvi died because the goddess Hel, Loki's daughter, wanted him for her sexual pleasure.		Ynglingatal (VII), Historia Norwegiæ, Íslendingabók, Ynglinga saga (17)	

== E ==
Figure	Names in medieval languages	Historical origin	Name meaning	Relationships	Early and English Attestations	Norse Attestations	German Attestations
Eadgils	Old English: Ēadgils, Old Norse: Aðils, Latin: Adillus or Athislus	Beowulf is generally considered to be based on historic people and events.	OE Ēadgils and ON Aðils don't correspond exactly. OE Ēadgils is derived from PGmc *Auða-gīslaz, while Aðils is derived from PN *Aþa-gīslaz, and the reason for the difference is probably the fact that Ēadgils was the closest match known to Anglo-Saxons. *Aþa- is from *aþal- meaning "noble", "prominent", *auða- means "wealth", "happiness". *Gīsl means "arrow shaft" or "hostage".	Eadgils and his brother Eanmund, are the sons of the Swedish king Ohthere, but they are exiled when their uncle Onela (Àli) assumes power. They seek refuge with the Geatish king Heardred who accepts them, which causes a war with Onela. Eanmund and Heardred are killed in the war. The new king Beowulf supports Eadgils and the war ends at the Battle on the Ice that is retold in Scandinavian sources as well, but with Danish involvement. After a visit by his queen Yrsa's son Hrólfr kraki he is severely wounded by him trying to recuperate the gold the fleeing Hrólfr has stolen from him. He was the father of Eysteinn.	Beowulf	Ynglinga saga, Historia Norwegiæ, Islendingabók, Skjöldunga saga, Skáldskaparmál, Hrólfr kraki's saga, Gesta danorum, and Chronicon Lethrense and Annales Lundenses	
Eadgils of the Myrgings	Old English: Eadgils, Latin: Athislus	The legend about Offa is probably based on historical inter-tribal rivalries before the Anglo-Saxon settlement of England.	See Eadgils, above.	Eadgils is mentioned in Widsith as the ruler of the Myrgings. In the Danish accounts, he is conflated with the Swedish king Athislus (Eadgils, see above) who invades the Schleswig region and kills its governor Frowinus in single combat. Wermund appoints Frowinus' sons Ket and Wig as his successors, and they avenge their father by ambushing and killing Athislus in Sweden. The cowardly murder brings disgrace on their tribe that will only be redeemed by their brother-in-law Offa who defeats two men in single combat, which appears in Widsith (line 42) as a fight against Myrgings.	Widsith (lines 93–96)	Gesta Danorum (IV), Brevis historia regum Dacie	
Eaha	Old English: Eaha		The name is a doublet of eoh and means "horse", from PGmc *eχwaz ("horse"). However, Möller considered the name with an intervocalic h to be impossible and emended it to Eawa, which is attested as the name of king Penda's brother. However, there are attestations of similar Old English forms of the name: Echha, Aehcha and the female name Acha.	During the battle of Finnsburg when Hnæf and his men are attacked by the Frisians, his men run to the doors of the hall to defend it. Eaha stands together with Sigeferth at one of the doors with the swords drawn, while Hengest, Ordlaf and Guthlaf stand at the other doors. However, unlike the other men involved nothing else is known about Eaha.	Finnsburg Fragment		
Eadwacer	Old English: Ēadwacer		The first element is from PGmc *auda- ("wealth"), and the second element is from PGmc *wakraz ("watchful, vigilant").	Eadwacer is mentioned in the lament ''Wulf and Eadwacer that is notoriously difficult to interpret.	Wulf and Eadwacer		
Eadwine^{1}	Old English: Ēadwine	The 6th c. Lombard king Audoin.	The first element is auda- ("wealth"), and the second element is wini ("friend"), from PGmc *weniz.	He is mentioned in Widsith, line 74 as the father of Ælfwine (Alboin).	Widsith (74, 117)		
Eadwine^{2}	Old English: Ēadwine		See Eadwine^{1}	Appears in Widsith, line 98 as the father of Ealhild (see Svanhild).	Widsith		
Ealhhild				see Svanhild.			
Eanmund	Old English: Ēanmund,	Possibly fictive as the name Ēanmund is well known from England, but not attested from Scandinavia. However, it could be an adaptation of a Scandinavian name such as Āmund or Ēmund.	Possibly an OE adaptation of PN *Aiwa-munduʀ, from PN *aiwa- ("ever") and *munduʀ ("protector").	A Swedish prince of the Scylfing (Yngling) dynasty. The sons of the Swedish king Othere, Eanmund and his brother Eadgils are exiled when their uncle Onela (Àli) assumes power. They find refuge at the court of Geatish king Heardred, but this causes a war with Onela, and in the ensuing battles, Eanmund and Heardred are killed. Eanmund is slain by Wihstan, Wiglaf's father who is fighting for Onela. In Scandinavian tradition, he may be remembered as Eymundr, and ally of Halfdan, in Hyndluljóð (15) and as Hømothus in Gesta Danorum.	Beowulf	Possibly in Hyndluljóð (15) and Gesta Danorum (IV)	
Eastgota	Old English: Ēastgota	The 3rd c. Gothic king Ostrogotha.	The Old English form means "East Goths" and is in the plural, although it doubtlessly refers to king Ostrogotha.	Appears in Widsith, line 113 and he is called "learned" and "good" which agrees with the positive mention he has in Getica.	Widsith, Getica		
Ebenrot	Middle High German: Ebenrôt, Old Norse: Avæntroð		The name may derive from MHG âbentrôt ("sunset"), or it may be a corruption of Eckenot, another brother of Ecke and Fasolt who appears later in the Eckenlied.	The brother of Ecke and Fasolt. In the Þiðreks saga, he is the giant son of Nordian^{1} and is killed by Vildiver (Wisselau).			Eckenlied, Þiðreks saga
Ecglaf	Old English: Ecglāf	Beowulf is generally considered to be based on historic people and events.	For the first element Ecg-, see Ecgþeow, below. The second element is *-laibaz which means "descendant" or "heir".	He is the father of Unferth (Beowulf, line 499).	Beowulf		
Ecgþeow	Old English: Ecgþēow	Beowulf is generally considered to be based on historic people and events.	PN: *Agiþewaz. The first element is either the same as Gothic agis meaning "fear", and ON agi meaning "disturbance", or derived from PGmc *agjō ("edge"), meaning "sword". The second element is *þewaz meaning "servant".	Ecgþeow was probably a Swedish warrior who belonged to the ruling Scylfing dynasty. Consequently, he could marry the only daughter of the Geatish king Hreðel and became the father of Beowulf, who had Hreðel as foster-father from the age of seven. He killed a Wulfing named Heaþolaf and received the protection of the Danish king Hroðgar who also paid the wergild. Ecgþeow became an old man but was dead by the time his son Beowulf visited Hroðgar.	Beowulf		
Ecgwela	Old English: Ecgwela	Beowulf is generally considered to be based on historic people and events.	For the first element Ecg-, see Ecgþeow, above. The second element wela means "wealth, prosperity, riches".	The Scyldings are called the "sons of Ecgwela" (Beowulf, line 1710).	Beowulf		
Ecke	Middle High German: Ecke, Old Norse: Ekka	Probably created to explain the origin of the name of Dietrich von Bern's sword Eckesachs.	PGmc *agjō- ("sharp").	A young giant who is sent by Queen Seburg to seek Dietrich von Bern. He is dressed by her in the golden armor of king Ortnit. Ecke finds Dietrich in Tyrol; Dietrich is unwilling to fight him, but Ecke forces him to. When Dietrich defeats him but kills and beheads Ecke when Ecke refuses to swear homage. Dietrich then takes Ecke's armor and sword and ties his head to his saddle. In one version, he throws Ecke's head at Seburg's feet. In the Þiðreks saga, Ecke is sent by the widow of king Drusian, who dies of grief at Ecke's death. Dietrich defeats him after his horse, Valke, kicks him, breaking his back.			Eckenlied, Þiðreks saga.
Eckehart	Middle High German: Eckehart, Old Norse: Fritila		First element PGmc *agjō- ("sharp"), second element PGmc *hardu ("hard").	The son of Hache. He is the protector of the Harlungen and associated with Breisach and Alsace. He fights with Dietrich against Ermanaric; in the Heldenbuch-Prosa, he kills Ermanaric and then stands in front of the Venusberg, warning people not to go in until the end of the days. In the Þiðreks saga, he is called Fritila.			Þiðreks saga, Dietrichs Flucht, Alpharts Tod, Rosengarten zu Worms, Heldenbuch-Prosa. Possibly in Ermenrichs Tod.
Eckenot	Middle High German: Eckenôt	Possibly the same figure as Ebenrot.	For the element Ecke-, see Ecke and Eckehart. The element -nôt means "need", from PGmc *nauđiz.	A giant, brother of Ecke and Fasolt. Dietrich von Bern kills him.			Eckenlied
Eckewart	Middle High German: Eckewart, Old Norse: Ekkivorðr	Possibly derived from Eckehard I (died 1002) or Eckehard II (died 1046), both margraves of Meissen.	First element PGmc *agjō- ("sharp"), second element PGmc *wardu ("guardian").	A margrave who accompanies Kriemhild to Attila's court after her marriage to Attila. He warns the Burgundians about the trap.			Nibelungenlied, Þiðreks saga, Dietrichs Flucht, Rabenschlacht
Egil^{1}	Old Norse: Egill. Old English: Ægil on the Franks Casket, possibly Old High German: Aigil on the Pforzen buckle.		PGmc Agilaz. The first element is either from PGmc *agjō ("edge"), or derived from Gothic agis meaning "fear", which is the same as ON agi meaning "disturbance". The second element is a diminutive -l- suffix. Egil^{1}'s historical basis may have been named *Aigil, based on the Pforzen buckle. This name derives instead from PGmc *aigo- ("possessor").	Brother of Wayland and Slagfiðr. He and his brothers see three swan maidens bathing and capture them by stealing their swan-skins. Egil^{1} marries Alruna, who, however, leaves after seven years so that he must look for her. In the Þiðreks saga, he is also a masterbowman and is forced to shoot an apple off the head of his brother Wayland by king Nithhad. He helps Wayland flee from Nithhad.	Franks Casket	Völundarkviða	Þiðreks saga, Pforzen buckle
Egil^{2}				See Ongentheow, for the Swedish king			
Eitil	Old Norse: Eitill		The word eitill has meanings like "nodule in stone" and "iron" as in the expression harðr sem eitill ("hard as flint"). de Vries derives it from eitr meaning "poison" or "rage", from PGmc *aitran ("poison").	Eitil and his brother Erpr^{1} were the sons of Atli (Attila) and Gudrun. Attila had killed her brothers Gunnar and Högni^{2}, so she exacted vengeance by killing, cutting up, cooking and serving their sons for him to eat.		Dráp Niflunga, Atlakvíða, Hamdismál	
Ekivrid	Latin: Ekivrid		For the first element, see Ecki. The second element is frithu, from PGmc *friþuz ("peace").	The fourth of Gunther's men killed by Walter of Aquitaine. He is an outlaw for having killed a man in Saxony.			Waltharius
Ella	Old Norse: Ella, Latin: Elli		A Scandinavian adaptation of the OE name Ælla.	He appears at the massive Battle of Brávellir as one of the Danish king Harald Wartooth's warriors against the Swedish king Sigurd Ring. Seeing his friend Hun, killed by Starkad, Ella wants to avenge his friend and takes on the giant warrior, only to be killed as well. Gesta Danorum only mentions him in a list of warriors sequentially killed by Starkad before he cuts off the hand of the shield-maiden Visna.		Sögubrot, Gesta Danorum (VIII)	
Elgfróði	Old Norse: Elgfróði		The name means "elk-wise". (In Europe, elk refers to what in North America is called the moose.)	The son of Bjorn and Bera and brother of Bodvar Bjarki and Thorir Hound's Foot. He has the body of an elk below the naval. He becomes a robber and advises Bodvar to join Hrólfr Kraki's heroes.		Hrólfs saga kraka	
Elsa	Old English: Elsa		See Else^{1}, below.	Appears in Widsith, line 117, where he appears to be a Lombard. He is not known from other sources.	Widsith		
Else^{1}	Middle High German: Else, Old Norse: Elsungr		The name Else is possibly based on PGmc *ali- ("other, strange").	The ruler of a Bavarian march on the right bank of the Danube and brother of Gelpfrat in the Nibelungenlied. He and his brother attack the Burgundians after the cross the Danube. In the Þiðreks saga, he is a jarl who tries to take vengeance on Dietrich von Bern for killing his father.			Nibelungenlied, Þiðreks saga, Biterolf und Dietleib
Else^{2}	Middle High German: Else		The element Els- is common in river names and Gillespie suggests a connection to Elsbaum ("alder tree"), which is a tree important in folk medicine.	A monstrous woman who overcomes Wolfdietrich. She is revealed to be a beautiful maiden after Wolfdietrich agrees to marry her or to give her one of his brother's marry her, depending on the version. She gives Wolfdietrich various magical gifts.			Wolfdietrich
Else^{3}	Middle High German: Else, Old Norse: Elsungr		See Else^{1}	The father of Else^{1} and Gelpfrat - in the Þiðreks saga, he is killed by Dietrich von Bern's grandfather Samson.			Þiðreks saga, Biterolf und Dietleib
Emerca, Embrica, Imbreke				See Harlungen.			
Eofor	Old English: Eofor	Beowulf is generally considered to be based on historic people and events.	PN: *Eburaz meaning "wild boar".	In Beowulf, a Geatish warrior who killed the Swedish king Ongentheow, in battle. He received the richest possible reward, the only daughter of king Hygelac. He may appear in Ynglingatal killing Ongentheow's cognate Egil^{2}, but this seems to have been misunderstood by Icelanders due to dialectal differences of the word farri ("boar" vs. "bull").	Beowulf	Possibly Ynglingatal	
Eomer	Old English: Ēomǣr		The name means "horse famous", and the first element eoh ("war horse") is from PGmc *eχwaz ("horse") and mǣre is from PGmc *mērjaz ("famous").	In Beowulf (lines 1960–1962), he is mentioned as the son of Offa of Angel, and related to Heming and Garmund. Together with Offa and Garmund (Wermund), he also appears in the genealogy of King Æðelred of Mercia (675–704).	Beowulf		
Eric^{1}	Old Norse: Eiríkr or Eirekr, Latin: Ericus	May be based on a historic 5th c. Swedish king.	Eirekr is from PN *aina- ("one", "alone") or *aiwa- ("always"), and the adjective ríkr from PGmc rīkia- ("rich", "powerful", "prominent") but it may also partly go back to *rīk(a)z ("ruler", "prince"), cf. Gothic reiks ("ruler").	According to the Ynglinga saga, a Swedish king of the Yngling dynasty who succeed his father Agne, together with his brother Alrekr. However, according to Historia Norwegiæ and Íslendingabók, Agne (Hǫgni) was the successor. They were skillful horsemen and competed in riding and having the best horses. One day they did not come back, but were found dead with crushed heads, and as they were unarmed, they were assumed to have killed each other with their bridles. In Gesta Danorum, Ericus is an ally of Gestumblindi (Odin) and kills the Swedish king Alricus in battle. In Gautrek's saga, Eric rules Sweden for a long time after Alaric's death and in the sequel Hrólfs saga Gautreksonar, Eric's daughter Thorbjörg is a shield-maiden.		Íslendingabók (27), Ynglingatal (10), Historia Norwegiæ, Ynglinga saga (19–20), Gautrek's saga, Hrólfs saga Gautreksonar, Gesta Danorum (V)	
Eric^{2}	Old Norse: Eiríkr or Eirekr		See Eric^{1}, above.	According to Ynglinga saga, he was the son of the king of Sweden, Yngvi^{1}, and he spent many years raiding with his brother Jorund, but he fell in a battle on the Fýrisvellir near Uppsala against the sea-king Haki^{1} who taken over his father's throne.		Ynglinga saga	
Eric^{3} (weather hat)	Old Norse: Eiríkr or Eirekr, Latin: Ericus Ventosi Pillei		See Eric^{1}, above.	The son of Ragnar Lodbrok and Thora and the full brother of Agnar^{4}. In Ragnarssona þáttr, the two brothers came to Mälaren and sent a message to Uppsala and told Eysteinn, their father's subking, that Eric would take over and marry his daughter Borghild^{2}. When the Swedes opposed this, they met Eric and Agnar in battle after which Agnar died and Eric was taken prisoner. Eysteinn offered him safe conduct and the hand of his daughter but Eric only wanted to die lifted and left to die on raised spears, which was granted. In Ragnars saga loðbrókar, they attack after their father had cancelled a visit to Eysteinn and the latter had ended the friendship. Agnar and Eric were not only met by the full force of the Swedish army, the king also let loose his sacred cow, Sibilja, which wreaked havoc on their army, and Agnar fell while Eric was captured. The ending is the same, but Eric also sent a ring to his loving step-mother with a poem. In Gesta Danorum (IX), Ragnar has a son named Ericus Ventosi Pillei (Eric Wind Hat) by his wife Svanlaug, and his father appoints him king of Sweden but he is later killed there by a man named Eysteinn (Ostenus). He corresponds to Erik Väderhatt (Eric Weather Hat) in Swedish folk tradition whose hat made the wind blow in the direction where it was pointed, recorded in the Swedish Chronicle.		Ragnars saga loðbrókar, Ragnarssona þáttr, Krákumál, Ad catalogum regum Sveciæ annotanda, Gesta Danorum (IX), Swedish Chronicle	
Eric^{4} Anundsson	Old Norse: Eiríkr Anundsson, Emundarson, Eymundarson		See Eric^{1}, above.	The Hervarar saga tells that when the Swedish king Björn at Haugi died, his brother Anund of Uppsala's son Eric succeeded him. It further relates that Eric was a contemporary of Harald Fairhair, and his son Björn Eriksson would be the father of Eric the Victorious. However, the reading of the name as Anund is not uncontested, because some translators of the manuscripts of Hervarar saga have read Emund instead of Anund, which agrees with Snorri Sturluson's Kings' sagas, where this king is not the son of Anund, but of Eymund or Emund. In Haralds saga hins hárfagra, Harald Fairhair conquers petty kingdoms and creates Norway because a beautiful girl named Gyda would not marry him unless he became as powerful as king Eric at Uppsala. In the rest of the saga, Eric is mentioned as a competitor for the petty kingdom of Värmland, and as long as Eric lived there were battles in Götaland. In Óláfs saga helga, it is mentioned that Eric used to raise the Swedish levy every summer to pillage overseas.		Hervarar saga, Óláfs saga helga, Haralds saga hins hárfagra	
Eric^{5} Björnsson	Old Norse: Eiríkr Bjǫrnsson		See Eric^{1}, above.	The Hervarar saga tells of an Eric who was the son of Björn Ironside and grandson of Ragnar Lodbrok. He succeeded his father as the king of Sweden, but ruled only for a short while. He was succeeded by his brother Refil's son Erik Refilsson, whom the saga makes the fourth king in the line of Swedish kings before Eric the Victorious.		Hervarar saga	
Eric E(y)mundarson				See Eric^{4} Anundsson			
Eric^{6} Refilsson		Old Norse: Eiríkr Refilsson	See Eric^{1}, above.	The Hervarar saga tells that Eric succeeded his uncle Eric Björnsson as the king of Sweden. He was a powerful king and a great warrior, and he was the father of Björn at the Barrow and Anund at Uppsala. He is also mentioned in the Prose Edda (Skáldskaparmál) as the patron of the skald Alf the Small.		Hervarar saga, Skáldskaparmál	
Eric^{7} the Eloquent	Old Norse: Eiríkr inn málspaki, Latin: Ericus Disertus		See Eric^{1}, above.	In the Prose Edda, Eric the Eloquent is mentioned among other legendary characters, and as a member of the Ylfing (Wulfing) dynasty (Codex Regius version) or the Yngling dynasty (Uppsala Edda version), but nothing else is told about him. In Gesta Danorum (V), he is one of the most important characters of book V. There he is a Norwegian who through his way with words becomes the chief adviser of the Danish king Frothi. The style of the account is so similar to that of Icelandic sagas that Axel Olrik probably accurately commented that there must have been a lost Norse saga, where Eric was the hero.		Prose Edda,Gesta Danorum (V)	
Ermanaric	Old English: Eormanrīc, Old Norse: Jörmunrekr or Erminrikr (Þiðreks saga), Latin: Iarmericus (Gesta Danorum), Middle High German: Ermenrîch	Historical Gothic king, died 376	"Universal-ruler", from PGmc *ermana- ("universal") and PGmc *rīk- ("ruler, powerful")	Father of Randver, uncle of Dietrich von Bern and the Harlungen, husband of Svanhildr. He kills his son, wife, and/or nephews at the instigation of Sibeche, and forces Dietrich von Bern into exile on the advice of Sibeche. In the OE poem Widsith, the narrator visits Ermanaric and lists his retinue. In Dietrichs Flucht, he has his nephews the Harlungen hanged and forces Dietrich to leave Lombardy by threatening to otherwise kill the prisoners he has taken although Dietrich has captured his own son. In the Þiðreks saga, dies after a long illness and Sibeche usurps the throne. In the Old Norse tradition, he hangs his son for supposedly sleeping with his new wife Svanhildr, while having her torn apart by horses. Svanhildr's brothers maim but do not kill him in his sleep.	Widsith, Beowulf	Guðrúnarhvöt, Hamðismál, Gesta Danorum, Völsunga saga	Annals of Quedlinburg, Þiðreks saga, Dietrichs Flucht, Rabenschlacht, Alpharts Tod, Ermenrichs Tod.
Erpr^{1}	Old Norse: Erpr		The same name as the Chattish Arpus, Frankish Erpo and Erpa. It is also found in Gothic Erpamara and Old English Earpweald. The phonetics point to a West Germanic origin, and it is cognate with ON jarpr, both from PGmc *erpaz ("dark brown"). The name could ultimately be a Germanic adaptation from a Hunnish name such as Arpad.	Erpr and his brother Eitil were the sons of Atli (Attila) and Gudrun. Attila had killed her brothers Gunnar and Högni^{2}, so she exacted vengeance by killing, cutting up, cooking and serving their sons for him to eat.		Dráp Niflunga, Atlakvíða, Hamdismál	
Erpr^{2}	Old Norse: Erpr, Latin: Adaocarus (Annals of Quedlinburg)	Not historical.	For Erpr, see above. Adaocarus may be a mistake for Odoacer.	Erpr is the son of Jonakr and the half-brother of Hamdir and Sörli, whose mother is Gudrun. Through their mother Hamdir and Sörli have a half-sister named Svanhild who has been trampled to death by Ermanic. At Gudrun's urging, they set off to kill Ermanaric in revenge for his killing of Svanhildr. When Hamdir and Sörli encounter Erpr, they kill him thinking he will not help them, but this means they only maim Ermanaric, who has them killed. According to the Prose Edda, they have the same mother, Gudrun, and they kill him because they are upset with her taunting and him being her favourite.		Ragnarsdrápa, Guðrúnarhvöt, Hamðismál, Völsunga saga	Annals of Quedlinburg
Erpfe^{3}				See Orte and Scharpfe (Erpfe)			
Ethgeir	Old Norse: Æðgeirr		Æð- means "blood vein", while geirr means "spear".	One of the four giant sons of king Nordian^{1}, he adds king Oserich/Osantrix against King Milias. He flees with his brother Aspilian to Austriki (Austria) after Attila defeats Osantrix. Osantrix then sends Ethgeir to King Isung in Bertangaland, and he guards the border. When Dietrich goes to Bertangaland with his champions, Widige (Vithga) finds the giant sleeping, wakes him, and challenges him to a duel. When Widige has gained the upper hand in the duel, Ethgeir offers to ransom himself with treasure from an underground chamber. Widige thinks that Ethgeir will try to trap him in the chamber, so tells Ethgeir to go in first and then beheads him.			Þiðreks saga
Etzel				See Attila			
Eugel	Early New High German Eugel		Possibly a descriptive name meaning "little eye" (cf. German Äuglein).	A dwarf, son of Nibelung, whose treasure has been stolen by a dragon. Siegfried defeats him and afterwards he helps Siegfried defeat the giant Kuperan. Siegfried takes his treasure thinking it belongs to the dragon, and Eugel prophesies Siegfried's marriage to Kriemhild and murder.			Lied vom Hürnen Seyfrid
Eyfura			The name means "island fir". The first element is from PN *awjō ("island") and the second from PGmc *furχwōn- ("fir")	The wife of Arngrim. Either the daughter of Svafrlami (Hervarar saga) or Froði (Gesta danorum).		Hervarar saga, Gesta danorum, Hyndluljóð.	
Eygrímr Bólmr				See Grímr.			
Eyjolf	Old Norse: Eyjólfr		The first element is from PN *auwjō meaning "happiness" and the second element is from úlfr which means "wolf".	Eyjolf was the son of a king named Hunding who was killed by Sigmund's son Helgi, who thus earned himself the cognomen Hundingsbane. Helgakviða Hundingsbana I tells that Helgi refused to give his sons compensation, and so they attacked him but were defeated and killed. The Völsunga saga names them Alf^{2} and Eyjolf, Hervard^{2} and Hagbard^{2}, but Helgakviða Hundingsbana I and II call them Alf^{2} and Eyjolf, Hjorvard^{3} and Havard. Helgakviða Hundingsbana II adds a brother named Heming, and the Völsunga saga adds yet another brother called king Lyngvi who killed Sigmund in battle. Norna-Gests þáttr tells that in the first battle against Helgi Hundingsbane, Eyjolf, Hervard and Hjörvard were slain, but Lyngvi, Alf and Heming escaped to be killed later in battle against Sigurd.		Helgakviða Hundingsbana I, Helgakviða Hundingsbana II, Völsunga saga, Norna-Gests þáttr	
Eylimi	Old Norse: Eylimi		The first element ey- is from PN *awjō ("island"), *auja ("happiness", "luck") or *aiwa ("ever"), and the second element limi means "broom" or "rod of twigs. According to Müllenhoff, the name means "evergreen" or "always with branches", and de Vries adds that it may have meant "luck-bringing branches".	In Helgakviða Hjörvarðssonar, king Eylimi is the father of the Valkyrie Sváfa^{1}, his only daughter who marries Helgi, the hero of the lay. According to Hyndluljóð (26), he was a scion of the Ödling dynasty, and it mentions another daughter named Hjördís and a relative named Hrauthung. Frá dauða Sinfjötla, tells that his daughter Hjördís marries Sigmund, and together they have the son Sigurd the dragon slayer. Grípisspá adds that beside Hjördís he has a son named Gripir who ruled a kingdom and was very wise. According to Grípispá (9) and Reginsmál (15), he was killed by the sons of Hunding. In the Völsunga saga, he is a rich and powerful king and both Sigmund and Hunding's son Lyngvi want to marry his beautiful and clever daughter Hjördís. Eylimi asks his daughter to choose and she wants Sigmund, because although he is very old, he is most famous. Later the angry Lyngvi attacks Eylimi and Sigmund and kills both, but he can't find Hjördís, who later bears Sigurd.		Helgakviða Hjörvarðssonar, Frá dauða Sinfjötla, Grípisspá, Hyndluljóð, Reginsmál, Völsunga saga, Norna-Gests þáttr	
Eymod	Old Norse: Eymóðr	Probably based on Eymund.	The first element ey- is from PN *awjō ("island"), *auja ("happiness", "luck") or *aiwa ("ever"), and the second element is móðr ("state of mind", "wrath", "courage"), from PGmc mōðaz.	In Guðrúnarkviða II and Völsunga saga, Eymod appears as one of Gudrun's suitors together with Yaroslav the Wise. In his translation of Guðrúnarkviða II, Hollander considers the mention out of place and moves it to the notes, and Finch comments that it probably refers to Eymund who helped Yaroslav the Wise against his brother.		Guðrúnarkviða II, Völsunga saga, Eymundar þáttr hrings, Yngvars saga víðförla	
Eysteinn	Old Norse: Eysteinn		The first element is from PN *awjō ("island"), auja ("happiness", "luck") or aiwa ("ever"), and the second element means "stone".	Eysteinn succeeded his father Eadgils (Aðils) as king of Sweden. During a banquet at Lófund (probably Lovön) he was surprised with all his men by the sea king Sölve and burnt to death inside the hall. He was the father of the later king Ingvar Harra.		Historia Norwegiæ, Ynglinga saga, Þorsteins saga Víkingssonar	
Eysteinn Beli	Old Norse: Eysteinn Beli, Latin: Eysten and Ostenus		For the meaning of Eysteinn, see above. The cognomen Beli means "roarer".	According to Hervarar saga, he was the son of Harald Wartooth and ruled Sweden until he was killed by the sons of Ragnar Lodbrok. In Ad catalogum, he ruled Sweden when Ragnar was absent from his kingdom. In Ragnarssona þáttr, he was the viceroy of Ragnar Lodbrok in Sweden. Ragnar's sons Agnar^{4} and Eric^{3} arrived and declared that Eric^{3} would take over and marry his daughter Borghild^{2}. When the Swedes opposed this, they met Eric and Agnar in battle after which Agnar died and Eric was taken prisoner. Eysteinn offered him safe conduct and the hand of his daughter but Eric only wanted to die lifted and left to die on raised spears, which was granted. Eric and Agnar's half-brothers Sigurd Snake-in-the-Eye, Björn Ironside, Hvitserk^{2}, Ivar the Boneless and their mother Aslaug^{1} attack Sweden and kill Eysteinn. In Ragnars saga loðbrókar, the two brothers attack after their father broken up his engagement to Eystein's daughter and the latter had ended the friendship. Agnar and Eric were not only met by the full force of the Swedish army, the king also let loose his sacred cow, Sibilja, which wreaked havoc on their army, and Agnar fell while Eric was captured. The ending is the same, after which Ivar the Boneless attack in revenge killing every living thing until they had slain Eysteinn. Krákumál specifies the location of his death as Ulleråker. Eric^{3} (Ericus) having been killed in Sweden by a man named Eysteinn (Ostenus) is also mentioned in Gesta Danorum (XI).		Hervarar saga, Ragnars saga loðbrókar, Ragnarssona þáttr, Krákumál, Gesta Danorum (XI), Ad catalogum regum Sveciæ annotanda	
Eysteinn Halfdansson, or Eysteinn Fart	Old Norse: Eysteinn Hálfdansson		See Eysteinn, above	Eysteinn was the son of king Halfdan Whiteshanks, and succeeded him in Romerike and Vestfold (the West-fold). He married Hildr, the daughter of Eric Agnarsson, the former king of the Vestfold. Eric's father Agnarr was the son of king Sigtrygg of Vendel. Since Eric had no son, and died while Halfdan Whiteshanks was still alive, father and son took over. Eysteinn went east to Varna (formerly a part of Østfold, "the East-fold") to pillage. Its ruler Skjǫldr was a skilled warlock and when he arrived to the shore and saw the departing ships, he took his cloak and blew into it after waving it around. When Eystein's ships rounded Jarlsø, he was sitting at the rudder and another ship came so close that a boom knocked him overboard. His drowned corpse was retrieved, and buried at Borre. He was the father of Halfdan the Mild. The Historia Norwegiæ only talks of his death as a sailing accident as Eysteinn Fart was passing between two islands.Ynglingatal calls him "Geatish" which is in a manner of speaking correct as his father came from Värmland.		Íslendingabók, Ynglingatal, Af Upplendinga konungum, Historia Norwegiæ, Ynglinga saga	
Eysteinn, king of Vestmarr	Old Norse: Eysteinn		See Eysteinn, above.	In Sögubrot, which is a surviving fragment of the Skjöldunga saga, the sons of Gandalf ask Sigurd Ring, the king of Denmark and Sweden, to ride with them in a war between their kingdom Alfheim and king Eysteinn of Vestmarr (modern day Westfold), across northern Skagerrak. Sigurd Ring had been married to their late sister Alfhild. There the fragment ends. The continued story on Sigurd Ring is preserved in Ad catalogum, but there Sigurd is already present with his troops in Vestmar and engages in a fated love story with Alfsol.		Sögubrot, Ad catalogum regum Sveciæ annotanda	
Eyvindr	Old Norse: Eyvindr skinnhǫll		For the first element see Eysteinn, above. For the second element there have been several explanations. It is probably from a PGmc *-winðuz, from a PIE agent noun *ṷen-tu-s, in turn derived from the root *ṷen- with meanings such as "to win, to be victorious". The cognomen skinnhǫll has not been satisfactorily explained, but may be from skinnhæll ("leather heel", "skin"), but the explanation is not very helpful.	Eyvindr is a suitor of Æsa the fair, the daughter of the Danish king Alf^{4}. He is Danish, prominent, powerful, wealthy and handsome. When he proposes Æsa's father has just been killed in revenge by Hildibrand^{1}, and so she asks for the advice of her friends instead. Asmund, the son of her father's champion Aki^{1} and unbeknownst to him the half-brother of Hildibrand^{1}, answers that she should marry him instead. She decides that she will marry the man who has the most beautiful hands after the summer's raiding season. When the autumn arrives, Eyvindr has stayed with the cooks and protected his hands in gloves, while Asmund's hands are leathery and full of scars, and tanned with the blood of the men he has slain. Seeing Eyvind's white and soft hands, she declares that they cannot compare in beauty to Asmund's manly hands. She will marry Asmund, but first he has to avenge her father.		Ásmundar saga kappabana	

== Sources ==
- Amodio, Mark C. (2014). The Anglo Saxon Literature Handbook. Vol. 15 (1 ed.). John Wiley & Sons, Incorporated. ISBN 9781118286517.
- Anderson, Carl Edlund (1999). Formation and Resolution of Ideological Contrast in the Early History of Scandinavia (PDF) (Thesis). University of Cambridge.
- Anderson, Earl R. (2008). "Beow the Boy-Wonder (Beowulf 12–25)". English Studies. 89 (6): 630–642. doi:10.1080/00138380802396045. S2CID 161149996.
- Andersson, Martin (August 2012). "Of Regner Lodbrog, Hugh Blair, and Mistranslations". Lovecraft Annual (6): 36–42. JSTOR 26868447.
- Byock, Jesse (1990). The Saga of the Volsungs: The Norse Epic of Sigurd the Dragon Slayer. University of California Press. ISBN 0-520-23285-2.
- Byock, Jesse (1998). The Saga of King Hrolf Kraki. Penguin Classics. ISBN 014043593X.
- Byock, Jesse (1999). The Saga of King Hrolf Kraki. Penguin Classics. ISBN 014043593X.
- Stories and Ballads of the Far Past. Translated by Chadwick, Nora Kershaw. Cambridge at the University Press. 1921.
- Chambers, R. W. (1912). Widsith. Cambridge University Press.
- Clarke, M. G. (1911). Sidelights on Teutonic History During the Migration Period, being Studies of Beowulf and Other Old English Poems. Cambridge University Press.
- Clark Hall, John R. (1916). A Concise Anglo-Saxon Dictionary for the Use of Students (2 ed.). New York, The Macmillan Company.
- Cleasby, Richard; Vigfússon, Gudbrand (1874). An Icelandic-English dictionary. Oxford Clarendon Press.
- Currie, Edward (2020). "Hygelac's Raid in Historiography and Poetry: The King's Necklace and Beowulf as 'Epic'". Neophilologus. 104 (3): 391–400. doi:10.1007/s11061-019-09627-4. S2CID 211673261.
- Dickins, Bruce (1915). Runic and Heroic Poems of the Old Teutonic Peoples. Cambridge: at the University Press. ISBN 978-1-107-63643-9.
- DuBois, Thomas A (2012). "Diet and Deities, Contrastive Livelihoods and Animal Symbolism in Nordic Pre-Christian Religions". In Raudvere, Catharina; Schjødt, Jens Peter (eds.). More than Mythology: Narratives, Ritual Practices and Regional Distribution in Pre-Christian Scandinavian Religions. Nordic Academic Press. pp. 65–96. ISBN 978-91-85509-71-3.
- Edda, Snorri Sturluson. Translated by Faulkes, Anthony. Everyman. 1995. ISBN 978-0460876162.
- Pálsson, Heimir, ed. (2012). The Uppsala Edda. Translated by Faulkes, Anthony. Viking Society for Northern Research, University College, London. ISBN 978-0903521857.
- Finlay, Alison (2010). "The Saga of Ásmundr, Killer of Champions". In Martin, Arnold; Finlay, Alison (eds.). Making History, Essays on the Fornaldarsögur. Viking Society for Northern Research, University College, London. pp. 119–139. ISBN 978-0-903521-84-0.
- Heimskringla (PDF). Vol. 1. Translated by Finlay, Alison; Faulkes, Anthony. Viking Society for Northern Research, University College London. 2016. ISBN 978-0-903521-86-4.
- Friis-Jensen, Karsten, ed. (2015). Saxo Grammaticus Gesta Danorum, The History of the Danes. Vol. 1. Translated by Fisher, Peter. Oxford University Press. ISBN 978-0-19-82052-34.
- Förstemann, Ernst (1900). Altdeutsches Namenbuch, Band 1: Personennamen (2 ed.). Bonn.
- Ghosh, Shami (2007). "On the origins of Germanic heroic poetry: a case study of the legend of the Burgundians". Beiträge zur Geschichte der deutschen Sprache und Literatur. 129 (2): 220–252. doi:10.1515/BGSL.2007.220. S2CID 161148492.
- The Saga of the Volsungs (PDF). Translated by Finch, R. G. London and Edinburgh: Nelson. 1965.
- Fulk, R.D.; Cain, Christopher M. (2013). A History of Old English Literature. Wiley-Blackwell. ISBN 978-1-118-45323-0.
- Garmonsway, G.N.; Simpson, Jacqueline; Ellis Davidson, Hilda (1968). Beowulf and its Analogues. . M. Dent & Sons ltd. ISBN 9780460038041.
- Gentry, Francis G.; McConnell, Winder; Müller, Ulrich; Wunderlich, Werner, eds. (2011) [2002]. The Nibelungen Tradition. An Encyclopedia. New York, Abingdon: Routledge. ISBN 978-0-8153-1785-2.
- Gillespie, George T. (1973). Catalogue of Persons Named in German Heroic Literature, 700-1600: Including Named Animals and Objects and Ethnic Names. Oxford: Oxford University. ISBN 978-0-19-815718-2.
- Goeres, Erin Michelle (2015). The Poetics of Commemoration: Skaldic Verse and Social Memory, C. 890-1070. Oxford: Oxford University Press.
- The Poetic Edda. Translated by Hollander, Lee M. Texas University Press. 1928.
- Jiriczek, Otto Luitpold (1898). Deutsche Heldensagen, Band 1. Strasbourg: Karl Trübner. ISBN 9783112176429.
- Johnston Staver, Ruth (2005). A Companion to Beowulf. Greenwood Press; Westport, Connecticut; London. ISBN 0-313-33224-X.
- Kaliff, Anders; Oestigaard, Terje (2018). Bronze Age Håga and the Viking King Björn, A History of Interpretation and Documentation from AD 818 to 2018. Occasional Papers in Archaeology. Uppsala University. ISBN 978-91-506-2711-4.
- Kaufmann, Hennig (1968). Ergänzungsband zu Ernst Förstemann: Personennamen. Wilhelm Fink.
- Kazanski, Michel (1991). Les Goths (Ier-VIIe s. ap. J.C.). Paris, Errance. ISBN 2-87772-062-4.
- Keller, Thomas L. (1981). "The Dragon in 'Beowulf' Revisited". Aevum. 55 (2): 218–228. JSTOR 20857427.
- Klaeber, Friedrich (2008). Fulk, R.D.; Bjork, Robert E.; Niles, John D. (eds.). Klaeber's Beowulf and The Fight at Finnsburg. University of Toronto Press. pp. 274–277. ISBN 978-0-8020-9843-6.
- Klein, Ernest (1966). A Comprehensive Etymological Dictionary of the English Language. Vol. 1 A-K. Elsevier Publishing Company, Amsterdam, London, New York.
- Krause, Arnulf (2010). Reclams Lexikon der germanischen Mythologie und Heldensage. Reclam. ISBN 978-3-15-010778-2.
- Kuhn, Sherman M. (1943). "The Sword of Healfdene". The Journal of English and Germanic Philology. 42 (1): 82–95. JSTOR 27704955.
- Phelpstead, Carl, ed. (2001). A History of Norway and the Passion and Miracles of the Blessed Óláfr (PDF). Translated by Kunin, Devra. Viking Society for Northern Research. ISBN 978-0-903521-48-2.
- Looijenga, Tineke (2003). Texts and Contexts of the Oldest Runic Inscriptions. Leiden, Boston: Brill. ISBN 9004123962.
- Malone, Kemp (1925). "Widsith and the Hervararsaga". Modern Language Association. 40 (4): 769–813. doi:10.2307/457522. JSTOR 457522. S2CID 164024412.
- Malone, Kemp (1953). "Royal Names in Old English Poetry". Names. 1 (3): 153–162. doi:10.1179/nam.1953.1.3.153.
- Malone, Kemp (1936). Wisith (1962 ed.). Rosenkilde and Bagger, Copenhagen.
- McKinnell, John (2005). Meeting the Other in Norse Myth and Legend. D.S. Brewer, Cambridge. ISBN 1843840421.
- McTurk, Rory (1991). Studies in Ragnars saga Loðbrókar and its Major Scandinavian Analogues. The Society for the Study of Mediæval Languages and Literature, Oxford. ISBN 0-907570-08-9.
- McTurk, Rory W. (2006). "Kings and Kingship in Viking Northumbria" (PDF). In McKinnell, John S.; Ashurst, David; Kick, Donata (eds.). The Fantastic in Old Norse Icelandic Literature, Preprint Papers of the 13th International Saga Conference, Durham and York 6th-12th August 2006. Vol. 2. pp. 681–688.
- Miller, Clarence H. (2007). "Fragments of Danish History". ANQ: A Quarterly Journal of Short Articles, Notes and Reviews. 20 (3): 9–22. doi:10.3200/ANQQ.20.3.9-22. S2CID 161363696.
- Nedoma, Robert (1999). "Die Runeninschrift auf der Gürtelschnalle von Pforzen–ein Zeugnis der germanischen Heldensage". In Bammesberger, Alfred (ed.). Pforzen und Bergakker neue Untersuchungen zu Runeninschriften. Vandenhoeck & Ruprecht. pp. 98–109.
- Neidorf, Leonard (2013a). "Beowulf before Beowulf: Anglo-Saxon Anthroponymy and Heroic Legend". The Review of English Studies. 64 (266): 553–573. doi:10.1093/res/hgs108.
- Neidorf, Leonard (2018a). "Beowulf as Pre-National Epic: Ethnocentrism in the Poem and its Criticism". ELH. 85 (4): 847–875. doi:10.1353/elh.2018.0031. S2CID 165792664.
- Neidorf, Leonard (2019b). "Legends of Chilperic in Anglo-Saxon England". ANQ: A Quarterly Journal of Short Articles, Notes and Reviews. 32 (1): 6–8. doi:10.1080/0895769X.2018.1474430. S2CID 166120123.
- Neidorf, Leonard (2020). "The Finnsburg Fragment, Line 14: Language and Legend". The Explicator. 78: 44–48. doi:10.1080/00144940.2020.1725408. S2CID 213494609.
- Nerman, Birger (1919). "Kung Agne och hans död på Agnefit". Fornvännen.
- Nerman, Birger (1925). Svenska rikets uppkomst. Stockholm: Generalstabens litografiska anstalt.
- Newton, Sam (1993). The Origins of Beowulf and the Pre-Viking Kingdom of East Anglia. Cambridge University Press. ISBN 9780859914727.
- Nerman, Birger (1945). "Svíagríss - konung Adils' guldring" (PDF). Fornvännen.
- Noreen, Adolf (1904). "Aun". In Westrin, Th. (ed.). Nordisk Familjebok. Vol. 2 (2 ed.). pp. 429f.
- Noreen, Adolf (1922). "Yngve". In Westrin, Th. (ed.). Nordisk Familjebok. Vol. 33 (2 ed.). p. 563.
- Olrik, Axel (1919). The Heroic Legends of Denmark. Translated by Hollander, Lee M. New York: The American-Scandinavian Foundation.
- Olson, Oscar Ludvig (1916). "The Relation of the Hrólfs saga kraka and the Bjarkarímur to Beowulf". Publications of the Society for the Advancement of Scandinavian Study. 3 (1): 1–104. JSTOR 40914974.
- Orchard, Andy (1997). Dictionary of Norse Myth and Legend. Cassel. ISBN 0-304-34520-2.
- Orel, Vladimir E. (2003). A Handbook of Germanic Etymology. Brill. ISBN 978-90-04-12875-0.
- Paz, James (2013). "Æschere's Head, Grendel's Mother, and the Sword That Isn't a Sword: Unreadable Things in Beowulf". Exemplaria. 25 (3): 231–51. doi:10.1179/1041257313Z.00000000033. S2CID 191618476.
- Peterson, Lena (2004). Lexikon över urnordiska personnamn. Uppsala: Institutet för språk och folkminnen.
- Peterson, Lena (2007). Nordiskt runnamnslexikon. Uppsala: Institutet för språk och folkminnen.
- Shaull, Erin M. (2016). "Ecgþeow, Brother of Ongenþeow, and the Problem of Beowulf's Swedishness". Neophilologus. 101 (2): 263–275. doi:10.1007/s11061-016-9508-2. S2CID 164608334.
- Simek, Rudolf (1993). Dictionary of Northern Mythology. Translated by Hall; Angela. D. S. Brewer. ISBN 0-85991-369-4.
- Sundqvist, Olof (2002). Freyr's offspring, Rulers and religion in ancient Svea society. Uppsala universitet. ISBN 91-554-5263-9.
- Sundqvist, Olof (2015). An Arena for Higher Powers Ceremonial Buildings and Religious Strategies for Rulership in Late Iron Age Scandinavia. Leiden, Boston: Brill. ISBN 978-90-04-29270-3.
- Townend, Matthey (1997). "Ella: An Old English Name in Old Norse Poetry". Nomina (20): 23–35.
- The Saga of King Heidrek the Wise (PDF). Translated by Tolkien, Christopher. 1960.
- Uecker, Heiko (1972). Germanische Heldensage. Stuttgart: Metzler. ISBN 3476101061.
- de Vries, Jan (1962). Altnordisches Etymologisches Worterbuch (1977 ed.). Brill. ISBN 978-90-04-05436-3.
- de Vries, Jan (1962). Altnordisches Etymologisches Worterbuch (2000 ed.). Brill. ISBN 90-04-05436-7.
- The Sagas of Ragnar Lodbrok. Translated by Waggoner, Ben. Troth Publications, New Haven, Connecticut. 2009. ISBN 978-0-578-02138-6.
- Wessén, Elias (1952). Wessén, Elias; Helgason, Jón; Knudsen, Trygve; Skautrup, Peter (eds.). Ynglingsaga. Svenska bokförlaget Norstedts, Stockholm; Ejnar Munksgaard, København; Dreyers forlag, Oslo.
- Westrin, Th. (1907). "Erik, svenska sagoprinsar". In Westrin, Th. (ed.). Nordisk Familjebok. Vol. 7 (2 ed.). pp. 790–791.
- Wiktorsson, Per-Axel (1974). Sveriges medeltida personnamn: Häfte 4. Botvidh - Elena. Stockholm: Kungl. Vitterhets Historie och Antikvitets Akademien.
