= Eric of Sweden =

Eric of Sweden or Erik of Sweden may refer to:

== Legendary or semi-legendary kings of Sweden ==
- Eric, brother of Alaric
- Eric, brother of Jorund
- Eric Weatherhat, legendary king of Sweden
- Erik Björnsson, legendary Swedish king, son of Björn Ironside
- Erik Refilsson, legendary Swedish king in the late 9th century
- Eric Anundsson, semi-legendary Swedish king during the 9th century
- Erik Årsäll, semi-historical Swedish king who ruled sometime between the 10th and 12th centuries

== Historical kings of Sweden ==
- Eric the Victorious, Swedish king c. 945 – c. 995
- Eric and Eric, fought each other for the throne around 1066
- Saint Erik, king before 1160 (speculative numeral: Eric IX)
- Erik Knutsson, king between 1208 and 1216 (speculative numeral: Eric X)
- Erik Eriksson, king between 1222 and 1234 (speculative numeral: Eric XI)
- Erik Magnusson, king between 1356 and 1359 (speculative numeral: Eric XII)
- Erik of Pomerania, king between 1396 and 1439: (speculative numeral: Eric XIII)
- Erik XIV, king between 1560 and 1568; the king that devised the numbering scheme that started with him and retroactively numbered his predecessors.

== Swedish princes ==
- Erik Birgersson (c. 1250 – 1275), Swedish duke, son of Birger Jarl and Ingeborg Eriksdotter
- Erik Valdemarsson the Elder (1271/1272 – 1330), son of King Valdemar of Sweden, senator
- Erik Magnusson (duke) (c. 1282 – 1318), son of King Magnus Ladulås
- Eric I, Duke of Mecklenburg (after 1359 – 1397), son of King Albert of Sweden, heir to the throne, ruler of Gotland
- Prince Erik, Duke of Västmanland (1889–1918)

== Infants ==
- Eric, prince 1260, son of Valdemar, King of Sweden (died young)
- Eric, prince 1277, son of King Magnus Ladulås (died young)
- Eric, prince about 1302, son of King Birger of Sweden (died young)
- Eric, prince about 1316, son of Valdemar, Duke of Finland (died young)
- Eric, prince 1359, son of King Erik "XII" (died at birth)
- Eric, prince 1410, son of Erik of Pomerania (died at birth)
