= Björn of Sweden =

Björn of Sweden may refer to:

- Björn Ironside (9th century), legendary Norse Viking chief and Swedish king
- Björn at Haugi (9th century), legendary Swedish king
- Björn Eriksson (9th–10th centuries), legendary Swedish king
- Styrbjörn the Strong (died c. 985), son of the legendary Swedish king Olof Björnsson
