= House of Munsö =

Protohistoric Swedish dynasty

House of Munsö Munsöätten
- Royal dynasty
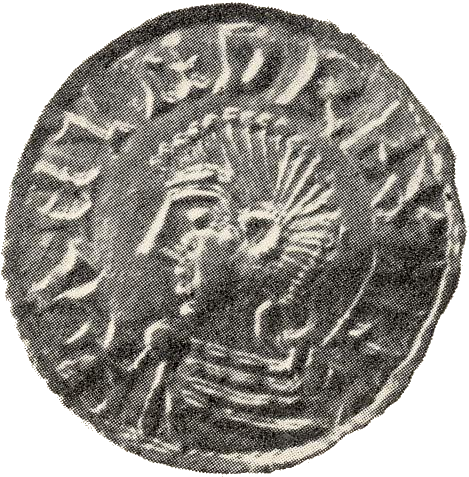
- Coin of Anund Jacob (r. c. 1022–1050)
- Country: Kingdom of Sweden
- Founded: c. 9th/10th century
- Founder: Björn Ironside (legendary); Eric the Victorious (earliest accepted)
- Final ruler: Emund the Old
- Titles: King of the Swedes
- Traditions: Norse Paganism (until 10th century); Roman Catholicism (10th–11th century)
- Deposition: c. 1060; 966 years ago

The House of Munsö (Swedish: Munsöätten), also called the House of Björn Ironside (Swedish: Björn Järnsidas ätt), the House of Uppsala (Swedish: Uppsalaätten) or simply the Old dynasty (Swedish: Gamla kungaätten), is the earliest reliably attested royal dynasty of Sweden, ruling during the Viking Age. None of the names suggested for the dynasty are universally accepted and most are problematic; the name "House of Munsö" derives from a questionable and speculative theory that they would have ruled from the island of Munsö and the name "House of Björn Ironside" derives from the supposed founder of the dynasty, Björn Ironside, who is often seen as a legendary, rather than historical, figure.

A long and elaborate sequence of kings of the Munsö dynasty can be found in 12th and 13th century Icelandic sagas, but the sagas are overwhelmingly considered unreliable, with the kings that appear in them seen as legendary figures. The sequence of kings in the sagas is contradicted by more contemporary German sources such as the 9th century writings of Rimbert and the 11th century work of Adam of Bremen.

== Etymology and historiography ==
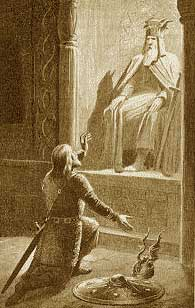
Eric the Victorious praying to Odin before the legendary Battle of Fýrisvellir, as envisioned by 20th-century artist Jenny Nyström

Due to a lack of preserved sources, little concrete information is known of Swedish kings during the Viking Age. Although long and elaborate king lists are provided by Icelandic sagas, sometimes contradictory mixtures of myths and poetry, and poems, these works (including texts such as Ynglinga saga, Hervarar saga, Ynglingatal and Langfeðgatal) are not considered reliable sources by modern scholars. Critically, a majority of them were written in the 12th to 13th century, centuries after the kings they described are supposed to have lived; what is genuine history and what is myth and legend is impossible to determine and everything contained in them must as such be regarded as legendary, if not fictional. The 12th and 13th centuries was a time when royal power was being consolidated in Norway, Denmark and Sweden and as such, king lists may have been created out of a political and social needs (i.e. justifying the rule of a royal dynasty), rather than a desire to tell genuine history. Many of Sweden's legendary kings would have preceded the Viking Age, but historical evidence of early geopolitics in Scandinavia suggests that larger political structures, kingdoms such as medieval Sweden, Norway and Denmark, did not form until the late Viking Age. The centralization of power under one monarch is believed to have resulted from, or at the very least have been connected to, Viking expansion, with petty kings increasing their power through aggressive military ventures directed both to foreign lands (i.e. Viking raids) and against their neighbors.

In his 12th-century work Gesta Danorum, Danish author Saxo Grammaticus wrote that the Swedish kings of the Viking Age were part of the dynasty of the Ynglings, a possibly entirely invented line of ancient Scandinavian kings supposedly descended from Odin, but this does not accord with the Icelandic sagas, which hold that the Ynglings were driven from Sweden in the middle of the 7th century and replaced by other dynasties. There is no preserved contemporary name for the Viking Age dynasty, and there exists no universally accepted name for them in modern historiography. The name "House of Munsö" (Swedish: Munsöätten) derives from a questionable and speculative theory that the kings of the 9th century transferred their royal seat of power from Uppsala (an important early political center in Sweden) to the island of Munsö in the lake Mälaren. The supportive evidence for this theory; a large burial mound on Munsö and a contemporary account by German missionary Rimbert giving the impression that the Swedish king had his seat near the island-settlement of Birka, is quite thin. Since the name "House of Munsö" arguably takes a stand in favor of this theory, it is commonly avoided in modern Swedish scholarship. The name "House of Uppsala" (Swedish: Uppsalaätten) derives from the fact that the Icelandic sagas often designate legendary Swedish rulers as kings "in Uppsala", and is similarly problematic. The dynasty is thus sometimes simply designated as "the Old dynasty" (Swedish: Gamla kungaätten), a more neutral designation. The rarely used name "House of Björn Ironside" (Swedish: Björn Järnsidas ätt) comes from the dynasty supposedly descending from the legendary Viking Björn Ironside according to the later Icelandic sagas. The big burial mound at Munsö was attributed, without evidence, to Björn Ironside by 18th-century historians, an identification that is not accepted by historians today.

== Kings of the Munsö dynasty ==
The line of Munsö dynasty kings presented by the Icelandic sagas is not accepted by modern historians, the legendary kings (including the supposed founder of the dynasty, Björn Ironside) typically not being recognized as actual historical figures. The four kings of the dynasty whose existence is corroborated by multiple sources, and who are thus generally accepted as real historical kings of Sweden and recognized as such by the modern Swedish monarchy are Eric the Victorious, Olof Skötkonung, Anund Jacob and Emund the Old. The answer to the question regarding who was Sweden's first king depends on what is meant with "Sweden"; the earliest king reliably known to have ruled both Svealand and Götaland, the core territories of the country, was Olof Skötkonung, who is also listed first in most medieval Swedish king lists.

Image	Name	Approximate reign	Succession and Notes	Ref
	Eric the Victorious; Eiríkr inn sigrsæli	c. 970–995 (c. 25 years)		
	Olof Skötkonung; Óláfr skautkonungr	c. 995–1022 (c. 27 years)	Son of Eric the Victorious; the first Christian king of Sweden and the first Swedish king to mint coins; sometimes considered to be Sweden's first king. Earliest king who can be proven to have ruled both Svealand and Götaland, the core territories of Sweden.	
	Anund Jacob; Anundr Iacob	c. 1022–1050 (c. 28 years)	Son of Olof Skötkonung. Was according to later sources given the epithet Kolbränna ("coal-burner") because of allegedly burning down the houses of his opponents. Most early Swedish and German sources speak favorably of him.	
	Emund the Old; Æmunðær gamlæ	c. 1050–1060 (c. 10 years)	Illegitimate son of Olof Skötkonung; the last king of the dynasty. Upon his death, Stenkil of the House of Stenkil became Sweden's king. Stenkil might have been related in some form, possibly either through a female line or through marriage, to the Munsö dynasty.	

=== Hervarar saga ok Heiðreks ===
The Hervarar saga ok Heiðreks has in some versions an addition which gives a regnal list of Sweden following the death of Ingjald Illråde, the last king of the Yngling dynasty. Sweden was first ruled by Ivar Vidfamne, then Harald Wartooth and his son Eysteinn Beli, before Björn Ironside conquered Sweden. He founded the House of Munsö, and the saga then follows his descendants until Philip of Sweden.

The following chart maps the descendants of Björn Ironside according to the saga:

House of Munsö Family tree

Björn Ironside
Erik Björnsson	Refil Björnsson
Björn at Haugi	Anund Uppsale	Erik Refilsson
Erik Anundsson
Björn Eriksson
Sigrid the Haughty	Eric the Victorious	Olof Björnsson
Olof Skötkonung	Styrbjörn the Strong
Anund Jacob	Emund the Old
Daughter, married to Stenkil

=== Vita Ansgari and Adam of Bremen ===
Rimbert, who travelled with the bishop Ansgar to Sweden as a missionary in the 9th century, wrote about several kings in Vita Ansgari. As Rimbert was a contemporary to the kings he writes about, the Vita is seen as a believable source. Adam of Bremen alludes to the kings mentioned by Rimbert and expands the list of kings to cover the following centuries. However, the distance in time is greater, and he is thus seen as a weaker source for the time before Eric the Victorious. Though no genealogical information is provided by either which confidently connects the kings they mention with Eric the Victorious and his descendants, they are typically assumed to have been part of the same royal dynasty. Attempts have been made to harmonize Rimbert's and Adam of Bremen's kings with the kings mentioned in the sagas (whose existence is otherwise seen as contradicted by their writings), but due to a lack of documented evidence, such attempts have to be considered unreliable and unverifiable.

==== Kings from the Vita ====
- Björn, who reigned c. 829 when Ansgar first visited Sweden at the important port-settlement of Birka. Björn was reportedly friendly to the missionaries but chose not to convert to Christianity (although one of his chief councilors, Hergeir, did).
- Anund, who is not mentioned as ruling over Birka (possibly ruling somewhere else in Sweden), having been driven from Sweden and taken refuge among the Danes. Anund promised Birka to the Danes as a reward for helping him gain revenge and attacked Birka c. 840. As Birka continues to be ruled by Swedish kings, it is unlikely that the attack succeeded.
- Eric, who was recently deceased by the time Ansgar visited Sweden for the second time c. 852. According to Rimbert's writings, some of the Anti-Christian Swedes suggested that Eric be worshipped as a god alongside the rest of the Nordic pantheon instead of the new Christian God.
- Olof, who reigned c. 852, during Ansgar's second visit to Sweden, having then only recently come to the throne. Olof's position of power was weak, since he did not dare support Ansgar's and Rimbert's Christianization mission out of fear of upsetting his people. According to Rimbert, Olof had to negotiate with his own nobles and the will of the gods (i.e. what should be done) was eventually determined through a lottery-like system, the results of which was determined by a council of religious figures rather than the king. Olof apparently warred against Courland.

==== Kings from Adam of Bremen ====
- Ring, possibly together with his sons Eric and Emund. If he co-ruled with his sons, they reigned c. 936. If there was not a co-regency, Ring might have ruled earlier, with his second son Emund reigning c. 936.
- Eric, son of Ring and either his co-ruler or direct successor.
- Emund, son of Ring and either co-ruler with Ring and Eric Ringsson, or the direct successor of Eric Ringsson.
- Emund, son of Eric and the direct successor of Emund Ringsson (or some co-ruler arrangement of the previous three monarchs). Adam of Bremen gives this king as Eric the Victorious's predecessor.

=== Other kings ===
There are also a few kings mentioned in various sources, but which are inconsistently placed in the regnal list, or not at all. These include:

- Eric, attested by the Sparlösa Runestone (from c. 800) as a king at Uppsala.
- Eric Weatherhat
- Erik Årsäll

=== Theory ===
- Ragnvald Ingvarsson, historian Omeljan Pritsak speculated that he could be related to Munsö house due to his rank in Varangian guards.
- Ingvar the Far-Travelled

== See also ==
- Uí Ímair
- List of Swedish monarchs

— Royal house — House of Munsö Founding year: 9th century Dissolution: 1060
New title Earliest attested Swedish dynasty	Ruling House of Sweden c. 970–1060	Succeeded by House of Stenkil
