= Olof (Swedish king 852) =

Proto-historic King of the Swedes
- Reign: c. 852
- Predecessor: Eric
- Successor: Ring
- House: Munsö (?)

Olof (Old Norse: Óláfr) was a Swedish monarch or local ruler who ruled over Birka, an important port town, and possibly Old Uppsala, an important early Swedish political center, in about 852, when the Catholic missionary Saint Ansgar made his second voyage from Germany to Birka in about the year 851 or 852 A.D. He had an ambivalent attitude to Christianity, and was known as a successful warrior king in the Baltic region.

Olof is not mentioned in the Icelandic sagas of the 12th and 13th century, which give a different line of succession of supposed Viking Age Swedish rulers, but the Vita Ansgari, the near-contemporary writings of Ansgar's companion Rimbert, and the 11th-century account of Adam of Bremen both mention him and are generally seen as more reliable than the sagas.

== Religious dispositions ==
Ansgar had undertaken missionary work among the Swedes in 829-831, and laid the foundations to a fragile congregation based in the important merchant town Birka. By the early 850s Ansgar, who was now Archbishop of Hamburg-Bremen, began to worry about the future of the community which was without a priest. He received the consent of the East Frankish ruler Louis the German to go to Sweden in person and received a personal letter to the Swedish king Olof. When he came to Denmark, King Horik I provided him with an envoy and a message which asked Olof to allow Ansgar to missionise freely.

Ansgar's biographer Rimbert, in his Vita Ansgari (Life of Ansgar) relates that the Archbishop arrived to Birka after having sailed for 20 days. The year is not certain but seems to have been 851 or 852. There he found that King Olof and a large part of the people were affected by a pagan counter-movement. A seer asserted that he had participated in the council of the Aesir who had expressed their dissatisfaction with the Christian god. In case the current gods were not sufficient to the people, the gods decided to accept the former King Eric (Erik Björnsson, or Erik Refilsson?) in their abode. The seer's vision was widely believed, a sanctuary was built in the honour of the long-deceased Eric, and people performed sacrifices to him.

Having installed himself in Birka, Ansgar invited King Olof to his place and feted him with a meal and gifts. The king announced that he would be glad to assist Ansgar, but dared not undertake anything before he had searched the will of the people, and divination had been carried out. "It is, namely, common among them, that every public issue is decided more through the unanimous will of the people, than through royal exertion of power." Some time later a thing was held in Birka, where a herald announced Ansgar's request to missionise among the Swedes. After due deliberation, the thing agreed to allow Christian priests and holy sacraments among them. A second thing, which was held at a different place in the realm, confirmed what had been said. The king summoned Ansgar and enjoined the construction of churches, providing the Archbishop with a piece of land in Birka for a chapel.

== Viking expedition to Courland ==
The Curonians in Latvia had once been under the Swedish realm. However, they had rebelled against the Swedes a long time ago and refused to pay them tribute. The Danes, being aware of this, saw the opportunity to take over the Swedish dominions in Courland. At the time of Ansgar's second visit to Birka, They marshalled a great fleet and sailed to Courland in order to take over their goods and to make the Curonians pay tribute to the Danes instead. The Curonians' gathered forces from all five of their towns and butchered half the Danish army, after which they plundered the Danish ships, gaining a great deal of gold, silver, and other valuables.

When the Swedes and King Olof heard of the Danish failure, they decided to win the reputation that the Swedes could do what the Danes could not and to make the Curonians pay tribute again. Consequently, the Swedes gathered an enormous army and attacked Curland. The first town they attacked was called Seeburg. It had 7,000 armed men, but the town was pillaged, ravaged, and burnt by the Swedes. The Swedes left their ships at the coast and started out on a five-day expedition into the hinterland. They reached the town of Apulia (probably modern Apuole). The town had as many as 15,000 armed men.

The Swedes stormed the town but it was ferociously defended, and after eight days of battle many men had fallen without result. By the ninth day, the Swedes were weary of the battle and discussed whether to pursue it. They decided to cast lots with runes, but without results. Rimbert then relates that some of the Swedes had heard of the Christian faith and they decided to cast lots asking the Christian god about how to proceed. They interpreted the results as full support from the Christian god and decided to attack the town once again.

When the Curonians saw that the Swedes were about to resume their attack, they gave up and offered to the Swedes all the gold, silver, and weapons that they had taken from the Danes the previous year. They also offered to pay half a pound of silver for every man in the town and to resume paying tribute to the Swedes and to give hostages as a warrant for paying. They declared that they wished to be the subjects of the Swedish kings as in former times.

King Olof granted their request, and the Swedes returned home with treasures beyond count and thirty hostages as a security for the Curonians' future loyalty.

The information in the Vita has been tentatively combined with archaeological findings in Latvia. According to the archaeologist Birger Nerman these indicate Swedish presence in the region in c. 650-800. Moreover, Nerman discovered arrows and other traces of a 9th-century battle in Apuole, while Seeburg was identified with Grobiņa at the coast which has graves which indicate connections with Gotland and the Mälaren Valley. There are nevertheless other interpretations of the place names mentioned in the Vita; Apulia might be Pilten at Ventspils which was also known as Ampule, while Seeburg could be Seleburg at the Daugava River.

== Later historians ==
According to Olov von Dalin Olef was the same person as Oleg the Wise and Olef was the term in the Adam of Bremen's chronicle due to misspelling of the rune. Igor Olofsson and Eric managed to kill one of Harald Fairhair's sons in the Baltic when they attacked. Without Igor's competent leadership the Norwegians would have won. Harald attempted to breach the large Swedish fortifications built by Eric. Olof mentions that they almost breached the Eastern walls. Apparently Eric Bloodaxe and Halfdan Haraldsson the Black also partook in the attack.

Ring Olof's son, according to Dahlin, was also called Igor or Ring. The Danes wanted to aid rebellions in the Baltic coast while Igor sent reinforcements that prevented the rebellions from spreading, defeated the Danes and kept Swedish suzerainty. Eric started constructing forts to impose Swedish tribute over the Baltic tribes that had been conquered by Sweden, also to protect the Baltic peoples from Danish and Norwegian vikings. According to Dahlin Sweden had several kings, often brothers, ruling at the same time and sharing power, which would explain the confusion with German historical sources and Norse sagas. Olaf would share power with Eric Anundsson.

== See also ==
- Early Swedish history

== Literature ==
Odelberg, Maj (1995), "Olof", Vikingatidens ABC, Swedish Museum of National Antiquities, ISBN 9171929843, archived from the original on 2007-09-01
