= Eric (Swedish king 800) =

Proto-historic King of the Swedes
- Reign: c. 800
- Issue: Eyvísl
- House: Munsö (?)

Eric (Old Norse: Eiríkr, Swedish: Erik) was a Swedish monarch or local ruler who ruled at Uppsala, an important early Swedish political center, around or before the year 800. His existence is attested by the Sparlösa Runestone, erected around the year 800, which mentions a "Eyvísl, Eiríkr's son" and that "the father sat in Uppsala" (i. e. Eyvísl's father, Eiríkr, was king in Uppsala).

== Historicity ==
As with other "proto-historic" Swedish kings (i.e. those preceding Eric the Victorious c. 970), Eric is poorly attested in the historical record. He was likely only a local ruler (the power of the Uppsala kings probably only extended to the immediate regions around Lake Mälaren), and is generally not counted as a "King of Sweden" in modern scholarship. The proto-historic kings are generally assumed to have been of the same dynasty as Eric the Victorious, the House of Munsö.

Attempts at consolidating those Swedish rulers have been made, with the elaborate lines of legendary kings presented in 12th and 13th century Icelandic sagas, but the sources do not agree with each other. Any attempt at identifying Eric with a king from the sagas has to be seen as unverifiable and unreliable. Another theory is that this Eric is the same king as the King Eric mentioned in the Vita Ansgarii.

== See also ==
- List of Swedish monarchs
- List of legendary kings of Sweden

Eric (Swedish king 800) House of Munsö
Preceded by None attested	King of the Swedes	Succeeded by Björn
