= Uppland Runic Inscription 13 =

Runestone fragment in Uppland, Sweden

Coordinates: 59°21′58″N 17°37′41″E

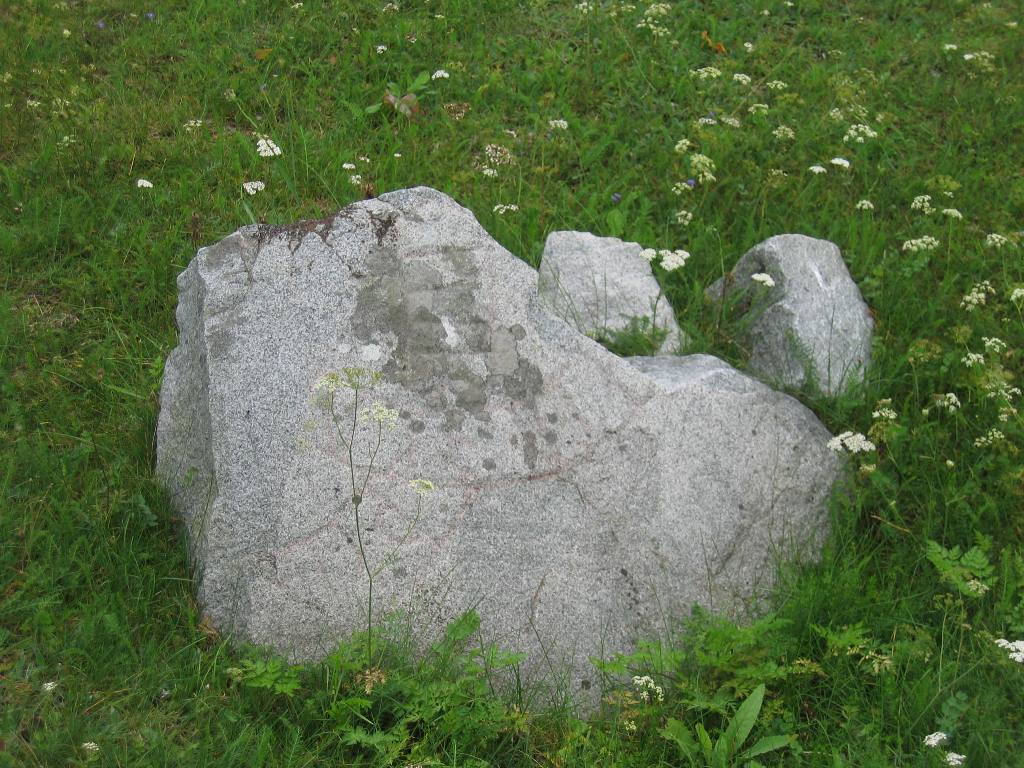
- Discovered: Munsö, Uppland, Sweden
- Rundata ID: U 13

Text – Native
- ... [Þo]rgautr þeir ... ... ǫndu ok Guð[s] ...

Translation
- ... Þorgautr, they ... ... spirit and God's ...

This runestone, listed as U 13 in Rundata, crowns the barrow of Björn Ironside in Uppland, Sweden. The stone is a fragment; broken pieces of the stone lie next to it.

== Inscription ==
A transliteration of the damaged runic inscription is:

... ...[r]kutr þaiʀ... / ... atu ' ok| |ku[þ]... ...
(... ... Torgöt the... / ... spirit and Gods... ... )

== Gallery ==
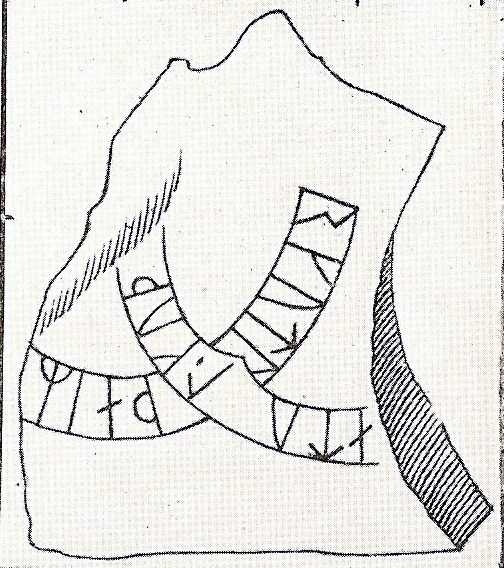
17th century drawing by Johan Peringskiöld.

== See also ==
- List of runestones
