= Olaf I =

Olaf I may refer to:

- Olof (I) of Sweden (ruled c. 854)
- Amlaíb Conung of Dublin (died c. 875)
- Olaf I of Norway (Olav Tryggvason), king of Norway (995–1000)
- Olaf I of Denmark (Oluf Hunger), king of Denmark (1086–1095)
- Óláfr Guðrøðarson (died 1153), King of the Isles (1112/1115–1153)
