= Eiríkr I =

Eiríkr I may refer to:

- Erik Björnsson, Eric I of Sweden (early 9th century)
- Eric I of Norway, known as Eric Bloodaxe (died in 954)
- Eric I of Denmark (c. 1060–1103)
