= Björn (Swedish king 829) =

Proto-historic King of the Swedes
- Reign: c. 829
- Successor: Eric
- House: Munsö (?)

Björn (Old Norse: Bjǫrn) was a Swedish monarch or local ruler who ruled over Birka, an important port town, and possibly Uppsala, an important early Swedish political center, around the year 829. His existence is attested by the nearly contemporary account Vita Ansgari, written by the missionary Rimbert, who visited Sweden alongside Ansgar in c. 852. He is in fact the first Swedish figure referred as king who is known from a reasonably reliable source. Older Swedish historiography often identified the king with the legendary figure Björn at Haugi, who was supposedly a Swedish ruler in the generation before the youth of Harald Finehair of Norway. This identification is however considered unverifiable, since Björn at Haugi may have actually been a Norwegian local ruler who was later constructed as a Swedish king. Although the genealogy of early Swedish local rulers is not known, Björn is assumed to have belonged to the House of Munsö, which would later produce Eric the Victorious, generally considered to be Sweden's first king. The royal names attested in the ninth century, namely, also occur among the kings and princes in the late Viking age, perhaps suggesting a genealogical continuity.

== Rimbert's account ==
Ansgar had previously worked in Denmark with the consent of King Harald Klak, a protégé of Emperor Louis the Pious. In 829, Swedish ambassadors arrived to the court of Louis in Worms. Among other matters they told the Emperor that many people in their country wished to embrace the Christian religion, and that their king endorsed the arrival of proper teachers. The Emperor summoned Ansgar and ordered him to go the land of the Swedes and investigate whether people were indeed prepared to accept Christianity. Thus Ansgar tread the journey together with his companion Witmar, sailing with a party of merchants. When about half-way, the ships were attacked by Vikings and those on board had to save themselves on shore. The missionaries lost the gifts and possessions they had carried, but nevertheless decided to proceed. After traveling a long distance, mostly by foot, they arrived to the port of the kingdom which was called Birka, where they were friendly received by the king, whose name was Björn ("Tandem ad portum regni ipsorum, qui Byrca dicitur, pervenerunt, ubi benigne a rege, qui Bern vocabatur, suscepti sunt"). Some scholars have called Björn "king of Birka", but this has no foundation in Rimbert's writings, as Rimbert merely writes that Ansgar went ashore in Birka, which was in King Björn's kingdom.

According to the Vita, King Björn discussed the arrival of the missionaries with his men, then announced that they were free to preach. Apart from the numerous Christian prisoners at the place, several people seemed interested in the new faith. To these belonged Hergeir, the chief of the port, who was a prominent adviser to King Björn. After having been baptized, he built a church on his personal land. Ansgar stayed in Sweden for one and a half years and then returned to the Emperor's court in 831. Björn gave him a letter to bring to Louis, "written in the particular way of the Swedes", thus presumably with runic script. In his stead an auxiliary bishop, Gautbert, was appointed for Sweden. However, his activity was cut short several years later. An anti-Christian riot broke out, not supported by the king. Gautbert's nephew Nithard was killed, and Gautbert and his retainers driven out of the country. It is not explicitly said if Björn was still alive at the time. The account indicates that the Swedish king had limited control over people.

== The extent of Björn's kingdom ==
The Vita is vague about the geography of Sweden, and there is no way of telling if the power of King Björn extended beyond the Mälaren Valley. When speaking of Ansgar's second visit to the Swedes in about 852, the Vita states that "almost the entirety of that land consists of islands", suggesting a mainly coastal and insular polity. The Vita Karoli Magni, written around the time of Ansgar's visit, has a short description of the Baltic region: "There is a bay which stretches from the western ocean in eastern direction, of unknown length but with a breadth that may not exceed 150 kilometers, while it is less at many sites. Many people live around this bay, Danes and Swedes, which we call Norsemen, live both on the northern shore and all the islands in the bay. The southern coast is however inhabited by Slavs, Aesti and a number of other people". This account, together with other sources from the 9th century, seems to indicate that the Danes and Swedes were the main Nordic peoples known to the continental authors, and that Björn's sphere of power was not merely local.
