= Björn Ironside =

Legendary Norse Viking and Swedish king

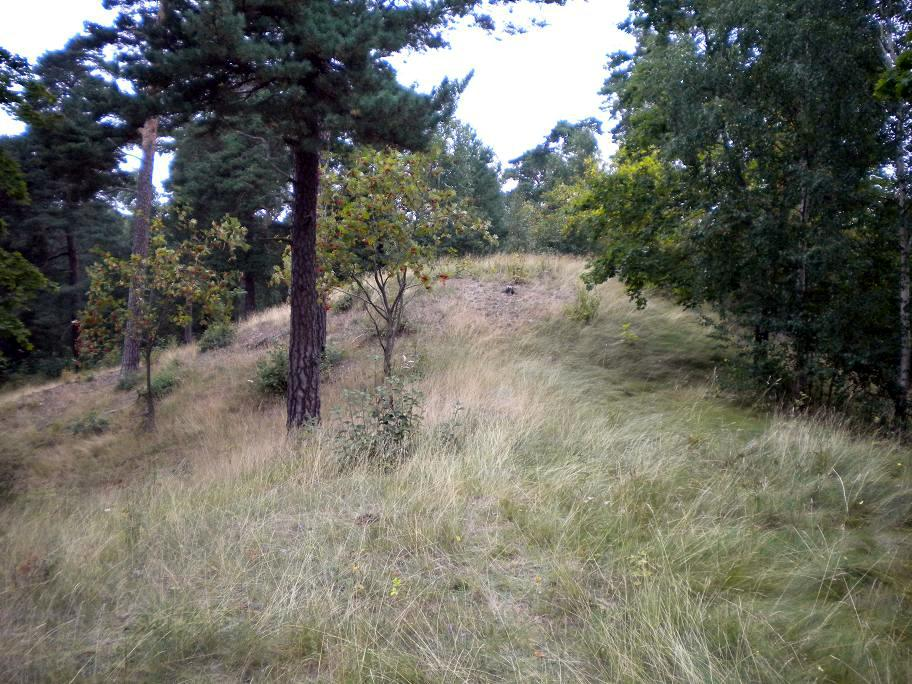
The barrow of Björn Ironside (Björn Järnsidas hög) on the island of Munsö, Ekerö, in lake Mälaren, Sweden. The barrow is crowned by a stone containing the fragmented Uppland Runic Inscription 13.

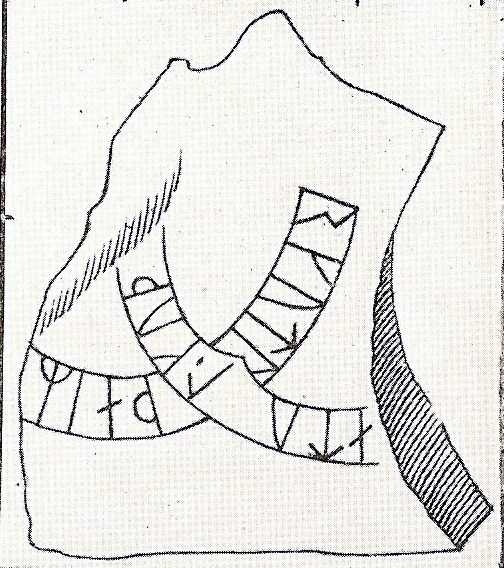
This runestone crowns the barrow of Björn Ironside in Uppland, Sweden. The stone is a fragment; broken pieces of the stone lie next to it.

According to Norse legend, Björn Ironside (Swedish: Björn Järnsida; Old Norse: Bjǫrn Járnsíða, pronounced [ˈbjɔrn ˈjɑːrnˌsiːðɑ] (Note: Modern Danish: Bjørn Jernside; Modern Icelandic: Björn Járnsíða [ˈpjœ(r)tn ˈjau(r)tn̥ˌsiːða]; Modern Norwegian; Bokmål: Bjørn Jernside; Modern Swedish: Björn Järnsida; Medieval Latin: Bier Costae ferreae; French: Björn Ier Côtes-de-Fer; German: Björn Eisenseite)) was a Norse Viking chief and Swedish king. According to the 12th- and 13th-century Scandinavian histories, he was the son of notorious Viking king Ragnar Lodbrok and lived in the 9th century, attested in 855 and 858. Icelandic sagas claim that Björn was the ancestor of the house of Munsö, the line of kings that ruled in Sweden until c. 1060. Medieval sources refer to Björn Ironside's sons and grandsons, including Erik Björnsson, Refil Björnsson, Björn at Haugi, Anund Uppsale and Erik Refilsson. In the early 18th century, a barrow on the island of Munsö was claimed by antiquarians to be Björn Järnsidas hög or Björn Ironside's barrow.

== Early life ==
"Berno" was a powerful Viking chieftain and naval commander. He appears in contemporary sources such as Annales Bertiniani and the Chronicon Fontanellense. He is first mentioned in the summer of 855. The oldest text that details his origins is the Norman history of William of Jumièges (c. 1070). According to William, the Danes had a custom of requiring the younger sons of kings to leave the kingdom, to reinforce the king's authority; thus, after Ragnar Lodbrok became king, he ordered Björn to leave his realm.

Björn left Denmark with a considerable fleet and started to ravage in West Francia. The contemporary annals show that he cooperated with another Viking called Sigtrygg and sailed up the Seine in 855, from which they raided the inland. Their combined forces were beaten in Champagne by Charles the Bald of West Francia in the same year, but not decisively. Sigtrygg withdrew in 856, but Björn received reinforcement from another Viking army and could not be expelled from the Seine area. He and his men took up winter quarters at the so-called Givold's Grave, which served as base for an assault against Paris, which was plundered around the new year 856–857. Björn constructed a fortification on the island Oissel above Rouen which he kept as his stronghold for years. He certainly swore fealty to Charles the Bald in Verberie in 858, but it is not clear if he kept his pledge. Charles besieged Oissel in July 858. The siege failed badly, for the pirates defended the fortification with vigour. Moreover, Charles's brother Louis the German of East Francia invaded his lands, and many vassals fell from him. Thus the siege was broken in September.

After Björn's meeting with Charles in Verberie, his name is not found in contemporary sources. However, the Viking warriors in the Seine continued their raids during the following years and even plundered Paris again in 861. In his despair Charles tried to use another Viking chief, Veland, whose men operated in the Somme region, to attack the Seine Vikings at Oissel. However, this scheme backfired since the two Viking armies made a deal and united their forces. The Norsemen were encamped by the lower Seine in 861–862 but then split again. Veland agreed to become a Christian and joined royal service, while the Seine Vikings went to sea. Some of them joined the fighting between the ruler of Bretagne and some Frankish counts.

== Expedition to the Mediterranean ==
Frankish, Norman, Arab, Scandinavian and Irish sources mention a large Viking raid into the Mediterranean in 859–861, co-led by Hastein, Björn Ironside and possibly one or more of his brothers. After raiding down the Iberian coast and fighting their way through the Strait of Gibraltar, the Norsemen traveled up the Ebro river and captured king García Íñiguez of Pamplona, for whom they received the enormous sum of seventy thousand dinars as a ransom. After that, they pillaged the south of France, where the fleet stayed over winter, before landing in Italy where they captured Pisa. Flush with this victory and others around the Mediterranean (including in Sicily and North Africa) during the Mediterranean expedition, the Vikings are recorded to have lost 40 ships to a storm. They returned to the Straits of Gibraltar and, at the coast of Medina-Sidonia, lost 2 ships to fire catapults in a surprise raid by Andalusian forces, leaving only 20 ships intact. The remnants of the fleet came back to French waters in 862. Björn Ironside was the leader of the expedition according to the chronicle of William of Jumièges. The early 11th century Fragmentary Annals of Ireland say that two sons of Ragnall mac Albdan, a chief who had been expelled from Lochlann by his brothers and stayed in the Orkney Islands, headed the enterprise.

William of Jumièges refers to Björn as Bier Costae ferreae (Ironside) who was Lotbroci regis filio (son of King Lodbrok). William's account of the Mediterranean expedition centers around Björn's foster-father Hastein. The two Vikings conducted many (mostly successful) raids in France. Later on Hastein got the idea to make Björn the Roman Emperor and led a large Viking raid into the Mediterranean together with his protégé. They proceeded inland to Luni, which they believed to be Rome at the time, but they were unable to breach the town walls. To gain entry a tricky plan was devised: Hastein sent messengers to the bishop to say that, being deathly ill, he had a deathbed conversion and wished to receive Christian sacraments and/or to be buried on consecrated ground within their church. He was brought into the chapel with a small honor guard, then surprised the dismayed clerics by leaping from his stretcher. The Viking party then hacked its way to the town gates, which were promptly opened letting the rest of the army in. When they realised that Luni was not Rome, Björn and Hastein wished to investigate this city but changed their minds when they heard that the Romans were well prepared for defense. Then they returned to western Europe, and were apparently summoned by a local muslim Spanish prince to go to Pamplona and capture king García Íñiguez, for whom they demanded a ransom. After that, the two men parted company. Björn was shipwrecked at the English coast and barely survived. He then went to Frisia where William says he died.

There are some historical challenges with this account. Hastein appears in the contemporary sources later than Björn, and to be his foster-father would have been around his 80s when he died. That is certainly possible, citing the fact that their contemporaries, the Viking Rollo and King Harald Fairhair of Norway lived comparable lifespans. Luni is also known to have been plundered by Saracens.

== Saga of Ragnar Lothbrok and Tale of Ragnar's Sons ==
The story of Björn and his brothers was retold in different versions throughout the Middle Ages. The Tale of Ragnar's Sons (Ragnarssona þáttr) is an Icelandic Fornaldar Saga from about the 14th century that combines traditional Norse oral history with legendary themes. It states that Björn was the son of Ragnar and Aslaug and that his brothers were Hvitserk, Ivar the Boneless, and Sigurd Snake-in-the-Eye. The tale also tells of Björn's half-brothers Eric and Agnar. The saga portrays Ragnar as the overlord of large parts of Sweden and possibly even Denmark.

While Ragnar was still alive, Björn and his brothers left Sweden to conquer Zealand, Reidgotaland (here Jutland), Gotland, Öland and all the minor islands. They then settled at Lejre in Zealand, Denmark with Ivar the Boneless as their leader. Eric and Agnar then sailed into Lake Mälaren and sent a message to the Swedish King Eysteinn, a vassal of Ragnar, requesting that Eysteinn submit to them. Moreover, Eric wanted Eysteinn's daughter Borghild as wife. Eysteinn said that he first wanted to consult the Swedish chieftains. The chieftains said no to the offer and ordered an attack on the rebellious sons. A battle ensued, and Eric and Agnar were overwhelmed by the Swedish forces, whereupon Agnar died and Eric was taken prisoner. Eysteinn offered Eric as much of Uppsala öd as he wanted, and Borghild, in wergild for Agnar. Eric proclaimed that after such a defeat he wanted nothing but to choose the day of his own death. Eric asked to be impaled on spears that raised him above the dead and his wish was granted. In Zealand, Björn, Aslaug and Hvitserk, who had been playing tafl, became upset and sailed to Sweden with a large army. Aslaug rode with cavalry across the land. In a great battle they killed Eysteinn.

According to the saga, Ragnar was captured and killed by King Ælla in England after a foolhardy invasion attempt. Björn and his brothers, seeking revenge, attacked Ælla but were beaten back. Ivar realised that the English king could not be defeated right away, so he sought reconciliation. He only asked for as much land as he could cover with an ox's hide and swore never to wage war against Ælla. Then Ivar cut the ox's hide into such fine strands that he could envelop a large fortress (in one saga it was York and according to another saga it was London) which he could take as his own. Ivar made himself popular in England and asked his brothers to attack again. During the battle Ivar sided with his brothers and so did many of the English chieftains with their people, in loyalty to Ivar. Ælla was taken captive, and in revenge they carved the blood eagle on him.

Björn and his brothers pillaged in England, Normandy, France, and Lombardy, until they came to Luna in Italy. When they came back to Scandinavia, they divided the kingdom so that Björn Ironside took Uppsala and Sweden.

== Other sources ==
The partly legendary Danish chronicle of Saxo Grammaticus, Gesta Danorum (c. 1200), is the first text to mention Björn Ironside as a king of Sweden. According to Saxo, Ragnar Lodbrok had a quarrel with the recently elevated ruler of the Swedes, Sörle. He therefore invaded the Swedish lands in company with his sons Björn, Fridleif and Radbard. Before battle had broken out, the opposing sides agreed to settle the matter through a combat. Ragnar and his three sons met the renowned champion Starkad and his seven sons in the sight of the two armies. "Björn, having inflicted great slaughter on the foe without hurt to himself, gained from the strength of his sides, which were like iron, a perpetual name [i.e., Ironside]". Ragnar and his sons slew their eight opponents, after which their troops fell on Sörle and his army and annihilated them. Ragnar then "presented Björn with the lordship of Sweden for his conspicuous bravery and service."

Later on, another son of Ragnar, Ubbe, colluded with his maternal grandfather Esbjörn and conspired against Ragnar. Esbjörn sent envoys to Björn in Sweden to drum up support for a rebellion, but Björn refused to listen. Instead, he hanged the envoys while their party were slaughtered by the Swedes. Shortly afterwards Esbjörn was slain in a sea battle, and Ubbe was captured after a heroic resistance. In due time Ragnar appointed Björn regent of Norway, while Sweden was handed over to another son, Eric Weatherhat. After the death of Ragnar, Björn and his brothers attacked King Ælla in England with 400 ships and killed him. He then went back to his Swedish kingdom, but intervened in Denmark when the Danes rose against the rule of Ragnar's sons. With a fleet of 1,700 ships, he and his brothers crushed the insurgents at Slesvig. This is the last we hear about Björn Ironside in the Gesta Danorum.

The Hervarar saga from the 13th century tells that Eysteinn Beli was killed by Björn and his brothers as told in Ragnar Lodbrok's saga, and they conquered all of Sweden. When Ragnar died, Björn inherited Sweden. He had two sons, Refil and Erik Björnsson, who became the next king of Sweden.

Anglo-Saxon and Irish sources suggest that the Danish invasion of England after 865 was led by three brothers called Ingvar (i.e. Ivar), Ubbe and Halfdan who, judging from the Irish Cogad Gáedel re Gallaib, were sons of a Ragnall (Ragnar or a similar name). Björn is not mentioned in this context, but later Norman tradition suggests that he may have been a brother. Ubbe is sometimes labeled the "Frisian Jarl," and the invaders are occasionally called Scaldingi (men from Schelde). The kingships of Björn is at times historically problematic since it is not supported by older sources and presents insurmountable chronological inconsistencies.

== See also ==
- History of Sweden (800–1521)

== Bibliography ==
- Lagerquist, Lars O. (1997). Sveriges Regenter, från forntid till nutid. Norstedts, Stockholm. ISBN 91-1-963882-5

Björn Ironside House of Munsö
Legendary titles
Preceded by Östen Beli	Semi-legendary king of Sweden	Succeeded by Erik Björnsson
