= Anund Uppsale =

Legendary king of Sweden
- Issue: Erik Anundsson
- House: House of Munsö
- Father: Erik Björnsson
- Religion: Norse Paganism

Anund Uppsale or Anoundus, 'Anund of Uppsala' (Old Norse: Önundr Uppsali), a son of Erik Björnsson of the House of Munsö, ruled Sweden together with his brother Björn at Haugi, according to Hervarar saga. He is called Uppsale because he stayed at Old Upsala, the era's religious centre. He and Björn are sometimes identified with similarly-named kings mentioned in Rimbert's Vita Ansgari and by Adam of Bremen.

== Norse tradition ==
The Hervarar saga recounts that Anund and his brother Björn succeeded king Erik Refilsson, their cousin. This happened about two generations before the reign of Harald Fairhair of Norway (c. 872-930). The two brothers shared the realm, so that Anund resided in Uppsala while Björn made his residence at Haugi ("the Barrow"). His son Erik succeeded him on the Swedish throne.

A Norwegian document from the early 14th century provides a few additional details. A certain Herjulf Horn-breaker was the standard-bearer of King Halfdan the Black of Vestfold in Norway, the father of Harald Fairhair. However, Herjulf fell out with his lord and escaped to Sweden where he was well received by King Anund. After a while he evoked the wrath of his new master as well, since he slept with Anund's kinswoman Helga. Once again, he was forced to flee, bringing Helga with him. The couple eventually settled in the then uninhabited Härjedalen. The document enumerates their descendants for 15 generations. This account is at least partly a construction, since Herjulf Horn-breaker is otherwise known as a pioneer settler in Iceland.

== The Vita Ansgari ==
The Vita Ansgari from c. 870 relates that a Swedish king called Anund was driven away from his country. The reason is unknown, but might have to do with rivalry between royal kinsmen. However, the Vita does not say how Anund was related to the other kings mentioned in the text (Erik, Björn, Olof). Anund stayed in exile in Denmark but was keen to regain his kingdom. He therefore approached the Danes and promised them the spoils of plunder from the important commercial center Birka. The Danish king at the time was Horik I who had spent time in exile in Sweden in c. 812-813 and therefore might have had a special relationship with members of the Swedish royal clan. Sometime in the 840s, Anund thus invaded Sweden with a large Danish host of 21 longships and 11 of his own, unexpectedly approaching Birka. At the time, the Swedish king (Björn at Haugi?) was far away, and the chiefs and popular levies had no time to gather. Only the Christian chief of the port, Hergeir, was there together with the merchants and townsmen. They sought refuge in the nearby fortification. Being too few to defend themselves successfully, the inhabitants sent envoys to Anund and offered their friendship and alliance. Anund demanded one hundred marks of silver, which was granted. The Danes felt tricked, since "every merchant owned more than they had been offered" and wanted to make a surprise attack on Birka in order to burn and plunder it. According to the Vita, Hergeir made the townsfolk turn away from the pagan gods and make promises to Christ the Lord in order to be saved.

In the meanwhile Anund tried to avert the self-willed plans of his Viking allies. He asked them to draw lots about whether it was the will of the Aesir that Birka should be destroyed, meaning that they were probably casting runes. The outcome was that there was no possibility to carry out the plan with any success, so that an attempt on Birka would bring bad luck to the Danes. They then asked where to go for plunder and the answer was to go to a certain Slavic town. The Danes accordingly left Birka, sailed over to the other town and seized it in a surprise attack. They then returned to Denmark with rich booty. As for Anund, he made peace with the Swedes and returned the ransom money to the townspeople. He then stayed in Sweden for some time since he sought reconciliation with his people.

== See also ==
- Early Swedish History

Anund Uppsale House of Munsö
Preceded by Erik Refilsson	Legendary king of Sweden with Björn at Hauge	Succeeded by Erik Anundsson
