= Björn Eriksson =

Legendary king of Sweden
- Reign: 882–932 (traditionally)
- House: House of Munsö
- Religion: Norse Paganism

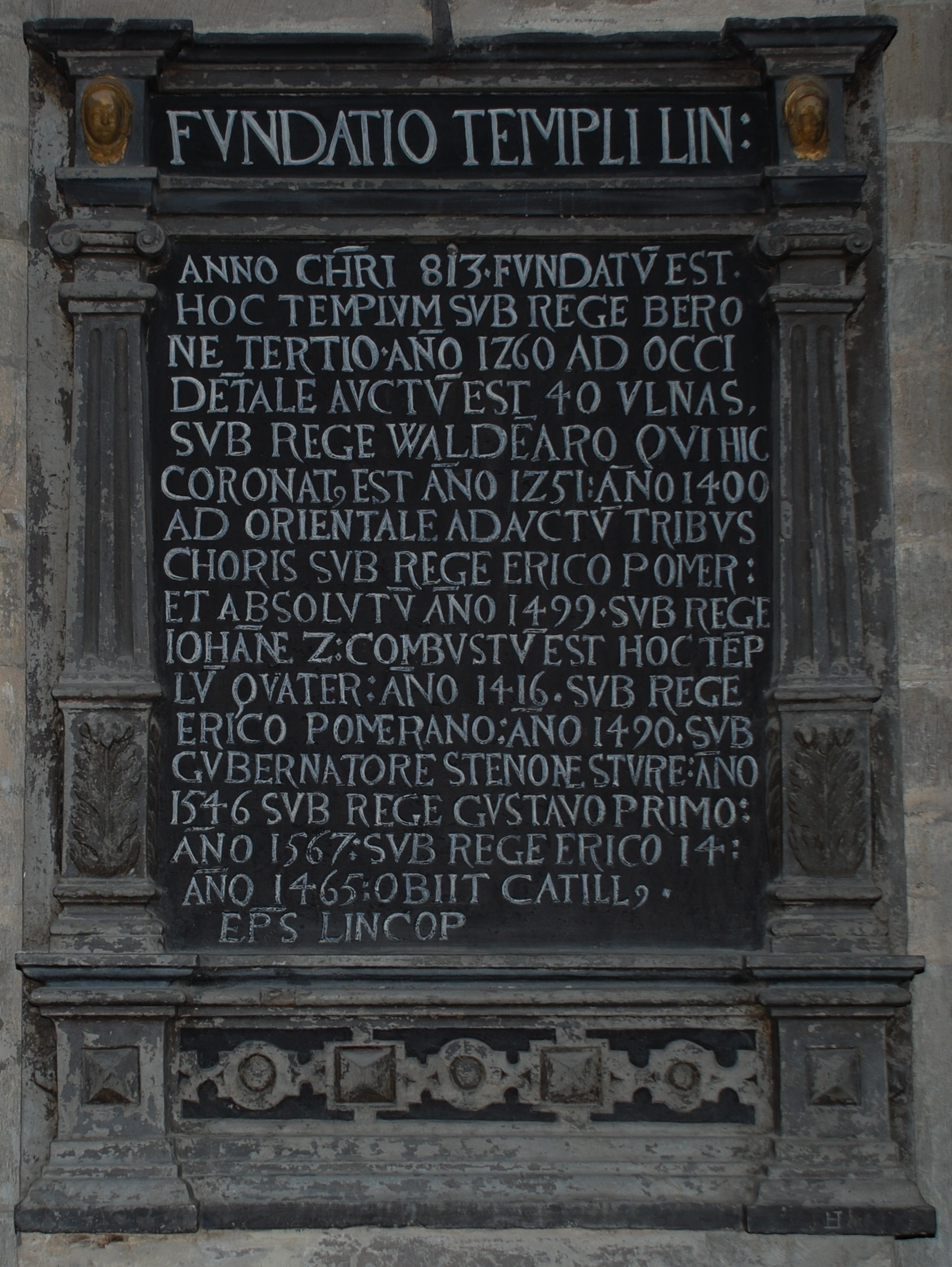
Plaque in Linköping Cathedral naming a King Bern/Björn III as the founder in 813 [sic]; the year is too early, and this may refer to this king or to Björn at Haugi or a strictly legendary character

Björn Eriksson (traditionally ruled 882–932) was a legendary king of Sweden.

== Mentions ==
According to the Hervarar saga and Harald Fairhair's saga Björn was the father of Olof Björnsson and Eric the Victorious, also a grandfather of Styrbjörn the Strong. According to the two sagas, he was the son of an Erik who fought Harald Fairhair and who succeeded the brothers Björn at Haugi and Anund Uppsale:

King Önund had a son called Eric, and he succeeded to the throne at Upsala after his father. He was a rich King. In his days Harold the Fair-haired made himself King of Norway. He was the first to unite the whole of that country under his sway. Eric at Upsala had a son called Björn, who came to the throne after his father and ruled for a long time. The sons of Björn, Eric the Victorious, and Olaf succeeded to the kingdom after their father. Olaf was the father of Styrbjörn the Strong.(Hervarar saga)

The latter saga relates that he ruled for 50 years:

There were disturbances also up in Gautland as long as King Eirik Eymundson lived; but he died when King Harald Harfager had been ten years king of all Norway. After Eirik, his son Bjorn was king of Svithjod for fifty years. He was father of Eirik the Victorious, and of Olaf the father of Styrbjorn. (Harald Fairhair's saga)

In Olaf the Holy's saga, Snorri Sturluson quotes Thorgny Lawspeaker on king Björn:

My father, again, was a long time with King Bjorn, and was well acquainted with his ways and manners. In Bjorn's lifetime his kingdom stood in great power, and no kind of want was felt, and he was gay and sociable with his friends. (Saga of Olaf Haraldsson)

When Björn died, Olof and Eric were elected to be co-rulers of Sweden. However, Eric would disinherit his nephew Styrbjörn.

Adam of Bremen, however, only gives Emund Eriksson as the predecessor of Eric the Victorious, around 970. His account is generally considered more reliable than the Icelandic sagas, and as such Björn Eriksson may be an entirely fictional figure.

== See also ==
- Early Swedish History
- House of Munsö
- List of legendary kings of Sweden

Björn Eriksson House of Munsö
Regnal titles
Preceded by Erik Anundsson	Legendary king of Sweden	Succeeded by Eric the Victorious (historical)
