= Björn at Haugi =

Legendary king of Sweden
- Reign: 9th century
- Born: Sweden
- Died: 9th century
- House: House of Munsö
- Father: Erik Björnsson
- Religion: Norse Paganism

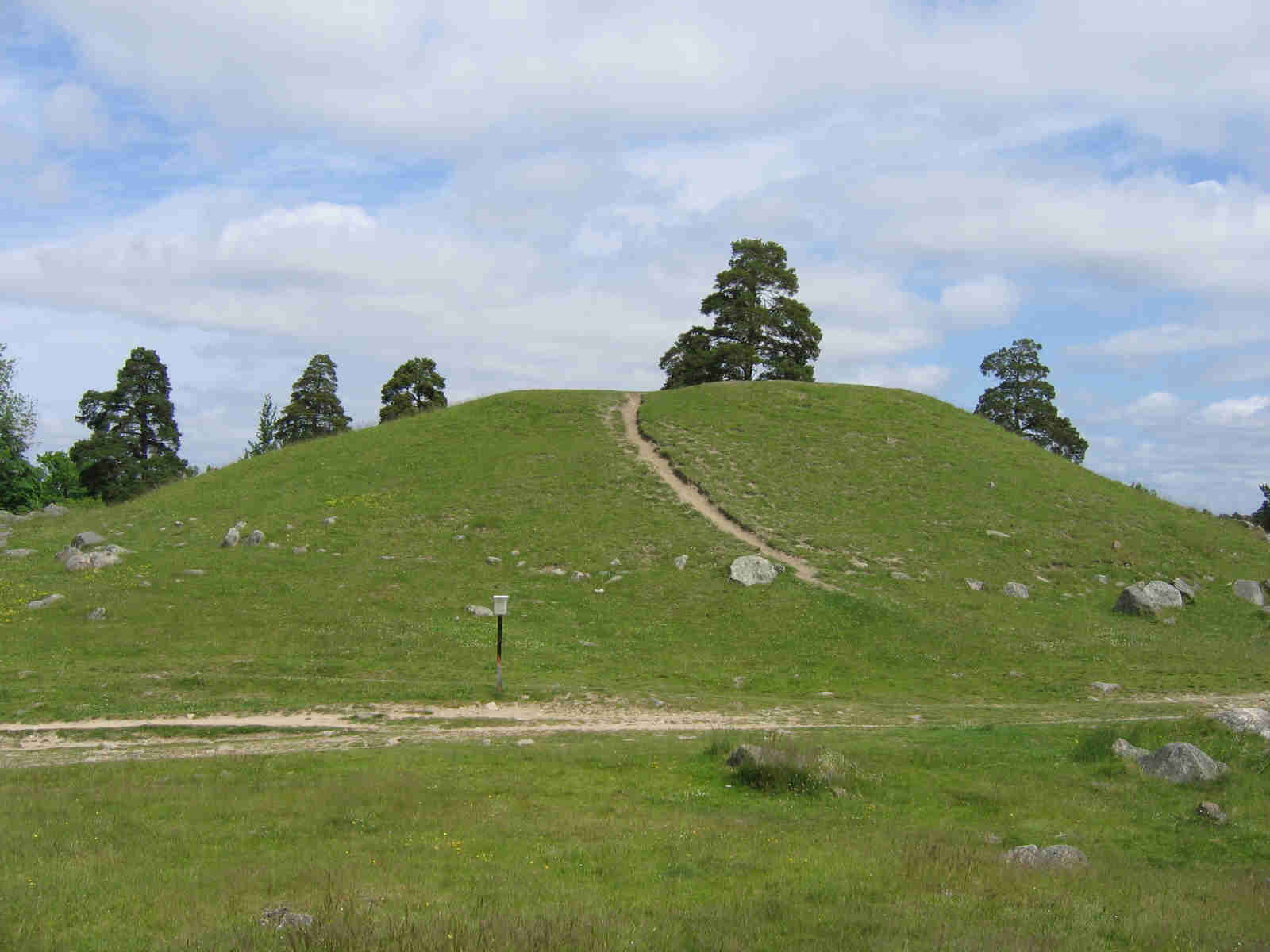
King Björn's barrow in Håga (the Old Norse word haugr meaning hill, knoll, or mound) near Uppsala. The Nordic Bronze Age barrow gave its name to the location Håga ("the barrow") and is probably the source of the cognomen of the king, at Haugi ("at the barrow"). As a result, the mound was in the 17th/18th centuries erroneously named after the king.

Björn at Haugi ("Björn at the Barrow" from the Old Norse word haugr meaning mound), Björn på Håga, Björn II or Bern was, according to Hervarar saga, a Swedish king and the son of Erik Björnsson, and Björn ruled together in diarchy with his brother Anund Uppsale. Björn at Haugi is sometimes identified with the historically attested Björn, a local Swedish ruler mentioned in the 9th-century Vita Ansgarii by Rimbert.

== The account of the Hervarar saga ==
The Hervarar saga is an Icelandic work from the 13th century. At the end of a saga, a short chronicle of the Swedish kings from Ivar the Wide-Fathoming to Philip (d. 1118) has been appended, where Björn at Haugi is mentioned:

The sons of Björn Ironside were Eric and Refil. The latter was a warrior-prince and sea-king. King Eric ruled the Swedish Realm after his father, and lived but a short time. Then Eric the son of Refil succeeded to the Kingdom. He was a great warrior and a very powerful King. The sons of Eric Björnsson were Önund of Upsala and King Björn. Then the Swedish Realm again came to be divided between brothers. They succeeded to the Kingdom on the death of Eric Refilsson. King Björn built a house called 'Barrow,' and he himself was called Björn of the Barrow. Bragi the poet was with him. King Önund had a son called Eric, and he succeeded to the throne at Upsala after his father . He was a mighty King. In his days Harold the Fair-haired made himself King of Norway. He was the first to unite the whole of that country under his sway.

This account dates king Björn to the first half of the 9th century, as his nephew Eric Anundsson was the contemporary of Harald Fairhair. Landnámabók mentions a Swede named Þórðr knappr who was one of the first settlers in Iceland and whose father was called Björn at Haugi. Moreover, Björn and his court skald Bragi the Old are mentioned also in Skáldatal, where a second court skald also is mentioned, Erpr lútandi.

The Icelandic scholar Jón Jóhannesson has argued that Björn at Haugi may in fact have been a petty ruler in Norway around the late 9th century, and is consequently not, as often hypothesized in older history writings, the same person as the Swedish king Bern (Björn) in the Vita Ansgarii who ruled around 829-830. The more original version of the Landnámabók seems to have contained two passages which associate Björn with persons from Sogn and Halogaland. Though evidence is not conclusive, Jóhannesson suggests that later tradition moved Björn from Norway (possibly Trondelag) to Svithiod due to certain legendary associations, or even since he had Swedish ancestry. The Icelanders may also have known about the Swedish Björn via the chronicle of Adam of Bremen (c. 1075), and assimilated him with the king in Skáldatal and Landnámabók.

== See also ==
- Early Swedish history

== Notes and references ==
Björn at Haugi House of Munsö
Preceded by Erik Refilsson	Legendary king of Sweden with Anund Uppsale	Succeeded by Erik Anundsson
