= Eric Anundsson =

Semi-legendary kings of Sweden
- Reign: ?–882 AD
- Predecessor: Björn Ironside
- Successor: Björn Eriksson
- Born: Gamla Uppsala, modern-day Sweden
- Died: 882 AD (according to tradition)
- Issue: Björn Eriksson, Ring of Sweden?
- House: House of Munsö
- Father: Anund Uppsale
- Religion: Norse Paganism

Eric Anundsson or Eymundsson was a semi-legendary Swedish king who supposedly ruled during the 9th century. The Norse sagas describe him as successful in extending his realm over the Baltic Sea, but unsuccessful in his attempts of westward expansion. There is no near-contemporary evidence for his existence, the sources for his reign dating from the 13th and 14th centuries. These sources, Icelandic sagas, are generally not considered reliable sources for the periods and events they describe.

Controversially, older Swedish historians have identified Eric with another legendary Swedish king, Erik Weatherhat, who is mentioned in some medieval king-lists as the predecessor of Eric the Victorious. However, Saxo Grammaticus identifies Erik Weatherhat with another figure, a son of the legendary Viking Ragnar Lodbrok.

== Eric's reign ==
He is given as the son of Anund Uppsale in the Hervarar saga (13th century):

Eiríkr hét sonr Önundar konungs, er ríki tók eptir föður sinn at Uppsölum; hann var ríkr konungr. Á hans dögum hófst til ríkis í Noregi Haraldr hárfagri, er fyrstr kom einvaldi í Noreg sinna ættmanna.

Eric was the son of king Anund, and he succeeded his father at Uppsala; he was a rich king. During his reign, Harald Fairhair came to power in Norway, Harald was the first of his kin to reign as a monarch in Norway.

However, the Eric who was contemporary with Harald Fairhair is called Eymundsson by Snorri Sturluson. Since the preceding king Anund is often identified with an Anund who flourished in the 840s and is mentioned by other sources (Rimbert and Adam of Bremen), Anundsson is probably the correct form of the patronym. The names Eymund and Anund were equivalent enough for the later king Anund Jacob to be called Emund (Eymund), in the Westrogothic law. Consequently, Eric's patronym would not be the only instance where the two names were confused.

According to Hervarar saga, he was preceded by his father Anund Uppsale and uncle Björn at Hauge, and later on succeeded by Björn (the father of Eric the Victorious and Olof Björnsson). Landnámabók informs that Eric and his son Björn ruled during the time of the Pope Adrian II and Pope John VIII, i.e. in the period 867–883, the time of the first settlement of Iceland. Harald Fairhair's saga relates that Erik died when Harald Fairhair had been king of all Norway for ten years. Traditionally this would indicate 882, but Harald's ascent to power is nowadays believed to have occurred later, in the 880s or c. 900.

Erik is mentioned in several places in the Heimskringla. In the saga of Olaf Haraldsson, Thorgny Lawspeaker relates:

My grandfather Thorgny could well remember the Uppsala king Eirik Eymundson, and used to say of him that when he was in his best years he went out every summer on expeditions to different countries, and conquered for himself Finland, Kirjalaland, Courland, Estonia, and the eastern countries all around; and at the present day the earth-bulwarks, ramparts, and other great works which he made are to be seen. And, moreover, he was not so proud that he would not listen to people who had anything to say to him.

== Conflict with Harald Fairhair ==
In Harald Fairhair's saga, Snorri Sturluson relates that Eric also wanted to extend Sweden westwards and to make a kingdom for himself as large as that of the Swedish king Sigurd Hring and his son Ragnar Lodbrok (i.e. Raumarike, Vingulmark and Westfold all the way to the island of Grenmar). Thus he conquered Värmland and all the land south of Svinesund (modern Bohuslän) and claimed the shores of Viken as his own, naming it all West Götaland. He placed Hrane Gautske (Hrane the Geat) as Jarl of the land between Svinesund and Göta älv. In these territories the people accepted Erik as their king.

When King Harald Fairhair arrived at Tønsberg (in Viken, and at the time a trading town) from Trondheim, he learnt of this and became very angry. He assembled the ting at Fold and accused the people of treason, after which some had to accept his rule, while others were punished. He then spent the summer forcing Viken and Raumarike to accept his rule.

When the winter arrived, Harald learnt that the Swedish king was in Värmland, after which he crossed the Ed forest and ordered the people to arrange feasts for him and his entourage. The most powerful man in the province was a man named Åke, who had formerly been one of Halfdan the Black's men, and he invited both the Norwegian king and the Swedish king to his halls. Åke had built a new hall instead of his old one, which was ornamented in the same splendid manner, but the old hall only had old ornaments and hangings. When the kings arrived, the Swedish king was placed in the old hall, whereas the Norwegian king was placed in the new one. The Norwegian king found himself in a hall with new gilded vessels carved with figures and shining like glass, full of the best liquor.

The next day, the kings prepared to leave. Bidding his farewell Åke gave to Harald's service his own twelve-year-old son Ubbe. Harald thanked Åke and promised him his friendship. Then Åke talked to the Swedish king, who was in a bad mood. Åke gave him valuable gifts and followed the king on the road until they came to the woods. Eric asked Åke why he, who was his man, had made such a difference between him and the Norwegian king. Åke answered that there was nothing to blame Erik for but that he had got the old things and the old hall because he was old whereas the Norwegian king was in the bloom of his youth. Åke also answered that he was no less the Swedish king's man than the Swedish king was his man. Hearing the words of treason, Eric drew his sword and slew the impudent Åke.

When Harald learnt of this, he and his retainers mounted their horses and chased after the Swedish king until they spotted him. When Eric and his men became aware that they were pursued, they rode as hard as they could until they had reached the wood that divided Värmland and Götaland. At this point Harald considered it best to return. He then spent the rest of the autumn killing all the Swedish king's men in Värmland.

In the winter, Harald plundered and burnt in Rånrike. In the meantime the Geats gathered an army, preparing to resist the Norwegians. When the ice broke up they drove stakes into the Göta älv to stop ships from entering. Nevertheless, the Norwegians invaded Götaland and laid their ships alongside the stakes. The Geats came down to the shore with a sizeable army and gave battle. A lot of people fell, but King Harald gained the victory. He then travelled far and wide in Götaland, winning most of the battles. In one of the battles, Hrane Gautske fell. Harald then proclaimed himself the ruler of all land north of Göta älv and north and west of lake Vänern and placed Guttorm Haraldsson to defend the region with a large force. There were disturbances between Harald and the Geats until King Eric died, ten years after Harald's ascension to power. He was succeeded by his son Björn (III) Eriksson who ruled the Swedes for 50 years.

== Contemporary references to the period ==
The only possibly contemporary sources for the war are three scaldic verses said to be composed by King Harald's skald Þorbjörn Hornklofi. One of them states that Harald was the enemy of the Geats and apparently won a victory over them. Another says that Harald subdued land and people south of the sea, and tied his ship to the stakes by the shore, without further specification. The verses mention neither Eric nor any Swedes. The historian Curt Weibull has characterised Eric as historically problematic, and doubted that the Swedes had anything to do with Värmland or West Götaland in the late 9th century. A late 9th-century geographical account preserved in an Anglo-Saxon manuscript, by Ohthere of Hålogaland, vaguely says that Norway borders "to Sweoland at the other side of the mountains, until the southern part of the country, and far up to the north". Another account in the same manuscript, by Wulfstan of Hedeby, says that Blekinge, Möre, Öland and Gotland belonged to the Swedes (hyrað to Sweon).

== Other accounts ==
The Flateyjarbók (late 14th century) has a different account about Eric Anundsson. It says that Björn at Haugi was king when Harald Fairhair became king in Norway. His successor Anund then ruled for at least 40 years, being succeeded by his son Eric who ruled for 47 years. Eric married Ingigerd, a daughter of Harald Fairhair. After some time she was to be sacrificed to the gods for unspecified reasons. The Swedes, therefore, brought the queen to an island where the blót would take place. She was however rescued by her brother Halfdan the Black (Junior) and brought to safety. This incident provoked long-time hostilities between Harald and Eric. Later on, Harald's trustee Hauk Håbrok went to Holmgard in Kievan Rus' to make purchases but had an adventurous confrontation with two champions of Eric who stayed there. A saga about Harald Fairhair's skalds also mentions a Swedish King Eric who was Harald's enemy; he is however given the patronym "Björnsson". According to 18 century swedish historian Olov von Dalin Eric Anundsson age was distorted by oral tradition. The age gap between Harald and Eric was reversed Harald was much older than Eric and his reign started in 900s. Eric died quite young in the early 900s during a failed Viking raid in France, while his son Björn Eriksson was very young, so King Ring of Sweden acted as regent while Björn came of age. Eric gave power to Ring or Igor since he knew he would probably not return alive from his viking expedition in France.

Harald Fairhair was much older than Eric according to Dalin.

== See also ==
- Early Swedish History
- Kings of Raumariki

Eric Anundsson House of Munsö
Preceded by Björn at Hauge and Anund Uppsale	Legendary king of Sweden	Succeeded by Björn Eriksson
