= Refil Björnsson =

Semi-legendary Swedish chieftain

Refil Björnsson (c. 850?) was a legendary king of Sweden of the House of Munsö, who allegedly lived and flourished in the late 9th century, in the early Viking Age, and had a certain dynastic importance. His historical existence is uncertain.

Virtually our only source for his person is the Hervarar saga ok Heiðreks (13th century) that concludes with a brief chronicle of Swedish kings up to 1118. This text says that the renowned Viking ruler Ragnar Lodbrok, after his demise, was succeeded by his various sons who ruled over Sweden, Denmark, the eastern lands (Austrríki) and England. Björn Ironside was assigned the Swedish realm. This information is historically problematic since Björn is otherwise known to have performed Viking raids in West Francia in the 850s and allegedly died in Frisia in the early 860s. According to the Hervarar saga Björn had two sons called Erik and Refil. Erik inherited the Swedish kingship, though he only ruled for a short time. The younger son Refil was a "warrior king and sea king" (herkonungr ok sækonungr), in other words a princely raider on the lines of his father and grandfather. When the main ruler Erik died, Refil was apparently dead already, since the next ruler was Refil's son Erik Refilsson who is praised as a great warrior and all-mighty king.

The late and compilatory nature of the Hervarar saga makes is difficult to assess the possible historicity of Refil or his son. According to the Skaldatal a certain Alf Jarl the Small composed one or several praise poems for Erik Refilsson, though nothing of this has been preserved. The name Ræfill is found in a list (Þula) of legendary and mythical figures, that is included in Snorri's Edda, in a section with poetic names for sea kings. Many of these sea kings have names ending with -ill which speaks for them being poetic inventions.

== Literature ==
- Ellehøj, Svend (1965) Studier over den ældste norrøne historieskrivning. Hafniæ: Munksgaard.
- Storm, Gustav (1877) "Ragnar Lodbrok og Lodbrokssønnerne; Studie i dansk Oldhistorie of nordisk Sagnhistorie", Historisk Tidskrift 2:1
- Tolkien, Christopher, & Turville-Petre, G. (eds) (1956) Hervarar Saga ok Heidreks. London: Viking Society for Northern Research.
