= Munsö =

- Village, island
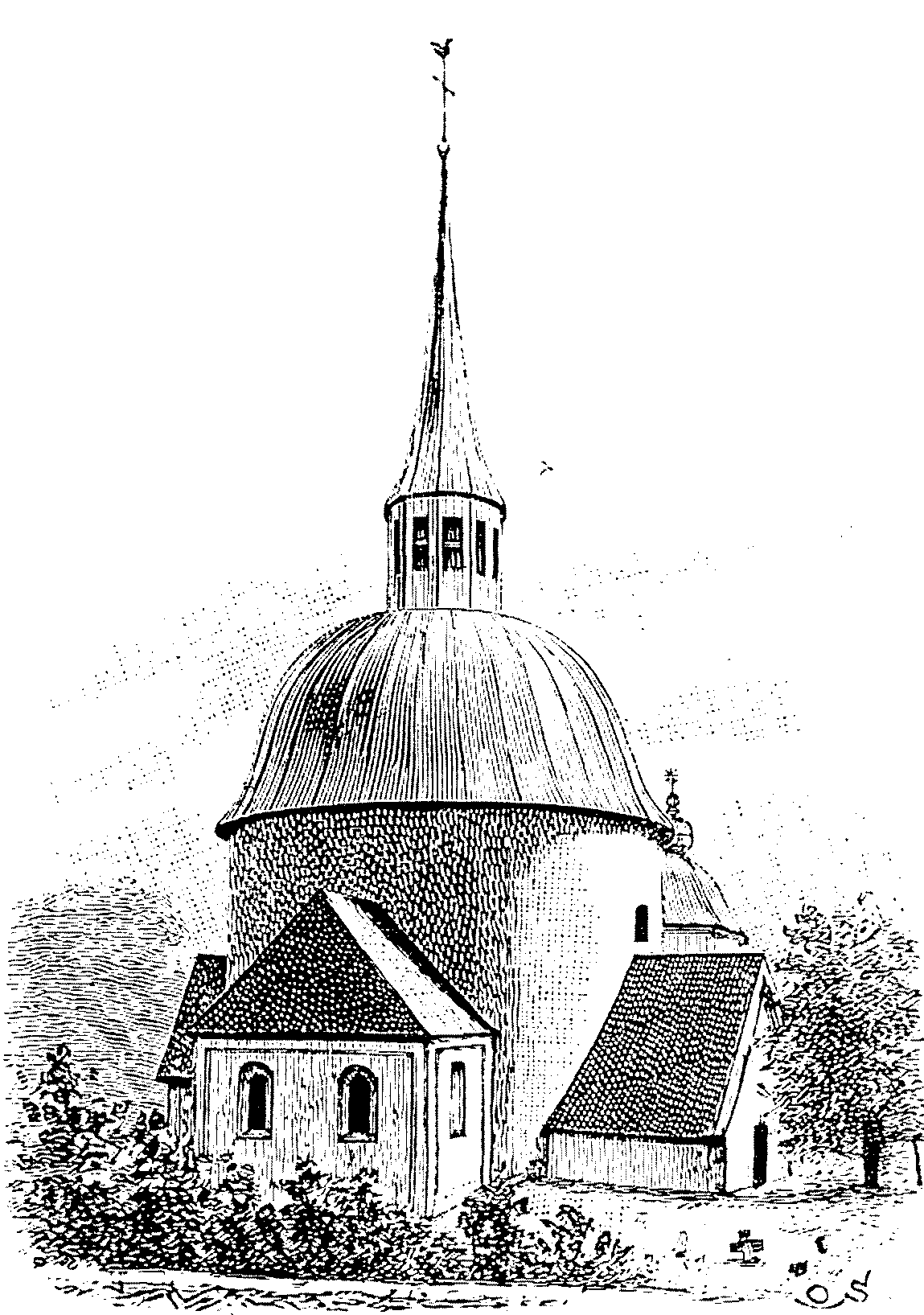
- The 12th century round church in 1874

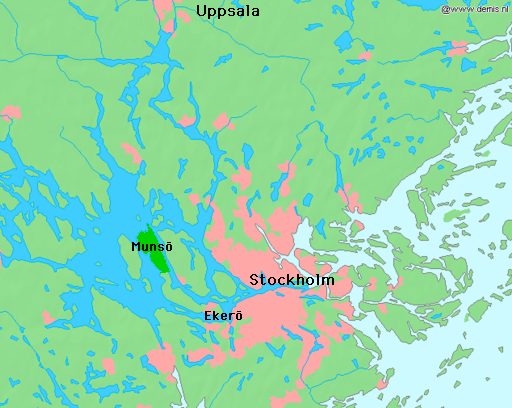
- Munsö (dark green), west of Stockholm.
- Coordinates: 59°23′57″N 17°33′51″E
- Country: Sweden
- Region: Stockholm County
- District: Ekerö Municipality
- Website: http://www.ekeroturism.se/munso.html

Munsö is a village and a former island (the latter is also known as Munsön) in Ekerö Municipality, Stockholm County in Sweden. Because of post-glacial rebound, this island in Lake Mälaren is now connected to the island Ekerön.

The village has a 12th-century round church.
