= Erik Refilsson =

Legendary king of Sweden

Erik Refilsson was a legendary king of Sweden of the House of Munsö, who lived in the late 9th century.

One of the few surviving Scandinavian sources that deal with Swedish kings from this time is Hervarar saga. The saga is from the 12th or 13th century and is thus not considered a reliable historical source for the 9th century. It says:

Then Eric the son of Refil succeeded to the Kingdom. He was a great warrior and a very powerful King. The sons of Eric Björnsson were Önund of Upsala and King Björn. Then the Swedish Realm again came to be divided between brothers.

== See also ==
- Early Swedish History

Erik Refilsson House of Munsö
Preceded by Erik Björnsson	Legendary king of Sweden	Succeeded by Björn at Hauge and Anund Uppsale
