= Erik Björnsson =

Semi-legendary Swedish king

Erik Björnsson was a legendary king of Sweden of the House of Munsö who would have lived in the 9th century. He is supposedly one of the sons of Björn "Ironside" Ragnarsson.

== The Saga of Hervör and Heidrek ==
One of the few surviving Scandinavian sources that deal with Swedish kings from this time is the Hervarar saga. The saga is from the 12th or 13th century and is thus not considered a reliable historical source for the 9th century. It says:

The sons of Björn Ironside were Eric and Refil. The latter was a warrior-prince and sea-king. King Eric ruled the Swedish Realm after his father, and lived but a short time. Then Eric the son of Refil succeeded to the Kingdom.

According to the Hervarar saga, his sons were Björn at Haugi and Anund Uppsale.

== Later interpretations ==
In Olof von Dalin's Svea Rikes historia (1747), which drew from sources later lost in the 1697 fire in Tre Kronor, the Rus' chieftain Rurik and Rorik of Dorestad are identified with Erik Björnsson.

Dalin claims that following the death of Hvitserk, Holmgård fell into anarchy and disorder. He connects this idea to a longer tradition of Swedish influence in Kievan Rus, beginning with the rule of Ivar Vidfamne. According to his reconstruction, this influence contributed to a reputation for maintaining order in the region, which led a Slavic chieftain named Godoslav to invite Erik Björnsson to rule.

This interpretation is used by Dalin to explain Erik Björnsson's limited attestation in Swedish sources and his disappearance from the historical record.

== See also ==
- Early Swedish History

Erik Björnsson House of Munsö
Preceded by Björn Ironside	Legendary king of Sweden	Succeeded by Erik Refilsson
