= Vita Ansgarii =

9th-century Latin-language Christian book by Rimbert

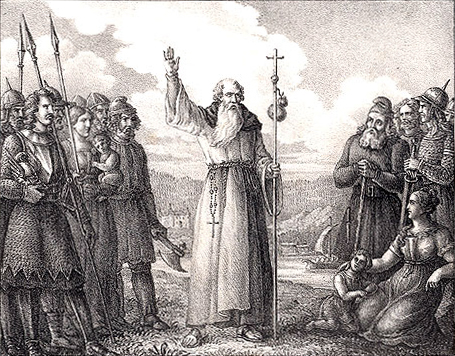

The Vita Ansgarii, also known as the Vita Anskarii, is the hagiography of saint Ansgar, written by Rimbert, his successor as archbishop in the Prince-Archbishopric of Bremen. The Vita is an important source not only in detailing Ansgar's Scandinavian missionary work, but also in its descriptions of the everyday lives of people during the Viking Age.

== Date ==
The Vita Anskarii was written sometime between the years 869 and 876.

== Author ==
Not much is known about Rimbert's life, the main source being the Vita Rimberrti, written 865–909. Rimbert was likely brought up at the monastery at Torhout in Flanders. His training as a monk was focused on missionary work.

Rimbert's early years residing in Flanders may explain why he shared such a strong passion for missionary work in the North. Like his predecessor, he may also have had Scandinavian origins, compelling him to save his people. Rimbert died in 888 which meant the missions to Scandinavia collapsed.

=== Rimbert and Anskar ===
Anskar was Rimbert's predecessor as Archbishop of Hamburg-Bremen.The diocese of Hamburg and Bremen had been unified in 845. Pope Leo IV was eager for more missionary work to take place but Anskar was nearing death and wrote about the missions to preserve their memory. Rimbert uses Anskar as a unifying saint of the newly bound archbishopric.

The Vita Rimberrti suggests Rimbert joined Anskar and Ebbo of Rheims on missionary whilst he was a young man and still residing at Torhout in Flanders although the truthfulness of this has been debated by historians.

== Literary context ==
The Vita Anskarii is a hagiographical text. Hagiography generally tends to be an idealised account, focusing only on the positive aspects of the saint's life. Although the genre of the piece is a hagiography the actual text contains a ‘multiplicity of forms’.

It also cannot be seen as a factual biographical work. Instead, its importance derives from its ability to show us the concerns and thoughts of Rimbert over ‘predestination, divine retribution and the rewards in showing consistency to faith imbued throughout'.

== Carolingian missionary work ==
In the text, missionary work is closely linked to Ebbo of Rheims and Rimbert presents Ebbo as a model alongside Anskar. Ebbo was involved in the earlier Carolingian missions under emperor Louis the Pious and initially had success with conversion of King Harald in 826. Ebbo’s deposition led to lack of influence for missionaries in the North at the courts of Carolingian rulers. After he betrayed Louis the Pious and was replaced with Hincmar of Rheims there was no further widespread push for their importance which limited resources to pursue missions.

Anskar and Rimbert’s attempts to bring the Christian faith to the North were largely unsuccessful long term. However, historian Nancy Wicker has stated the missions did have an impact. By looking at finds of female remains at the site at Birka, archeologists reported them wearing ‘crosses, crucifixes and open-work cross keys.’ She argues that they were most likely to have been targeted first for conversion as women were viewed as having the responsibility to bring up their children and thus spread the Christian message.

The Vita Anskarii was linked to the works of Paschasius Radbertus, who saw missions as fulfillment of the scripture. Rimbert and Anskar wanted to understand pagan religion and refute it intellectually, not through the use of force. The text also highlights the significant decline of interest that Louis the German and his East Frankish Kingdom had in funding missionary work to the North.

== Functions of the text ==
Hagiographies could often alter the truth to project a message. The Vita Anskarii does this in two main ways. The text presents a theological message by harnessing visions and miracles to present the ideas of predestination, divine retribution and the reward of consistent faith. The miracles described in the text therefore were used to convince priests that God would protect them on what could be dangerous missions into the North. This hagiographical text also is political as it defends the union of Hamburg and Bremen. It places the unification roughly halfway through the text and frames it as a successful diocese. The archbishopric of Hamburg-Bremen was seen as an inferior archbishopric so it was difficult for Rimbert to obtain support from the Eastern Franks.

The different functions of the text are linked by the desire to continue missions and obtain help from the Western Franks. The text was directed at the monastery of Corbie, a natural place to garner support as Anskar had been a monk there. Corbie was also closely linked with the Carolingian dynasty. Charles the Bald, king of West Francia was therefore potentially a more fruitful target for obtaining resources to aid with missionary work.

Another function of the text was to reassure priests on what they were to expect on a mission. The text also defends missionary work to monks who lived under the Rule of Saint Benedict and would have needed justification to leave their monastery which warned against going into the secular world.

== Legacy of the text ==
Whilst Rimbert was penning the Vita, enthusiasm for missionary work from secular and ecclesiastical leaders was uncommon. Therefore, Rimbert wanted to use the saint's life to encourage priests to go on missions and for bishops to supply funds to support the cause. However, due to sustained Viking attacks, Scandinavians became increasingly unpopular in the 880s which further deadened enthusiasm to convert Northmen. The death of Rimbert in 888 signified the collapse of Carolingian efforts to convert.
