= Rimbert =

(Archbishop of Hamburg-Bremen (c. 830–888)

Saint Rimbert

Apostle of the North
- Born: c. 830
- Died: c. 888
- Venerated in: Roman Catholic Church
- Feast: 11 June

Saint Rimbert (or Rembert) (c. 830 - 11 June 888 in Bremen) was archbishop of Hamburg-Bremen, in the northern part of the Kingdom of East Frankia from 865 until his death in 888. He most famously wrote the life of Saint Ansgar, the Vita Ansgari, one of the most popular hagiographies of the middle ages.

== Biography ==
Little is directly known about Rimbert, much of the information available regarding his life comes from the Vita Rimberti, a hagiography written by an unknown author, likely produced some time in the 10th century. While his place of birth is uncertain it is widely accepted by historians that Rimbert was Danish. As a monk he trained in Turholt (Torhout), after which he shared a missionary trip to Scandinavia with his mentor Ansgar, Bishop of Hamburg. Upon Ansgar's death in 865, Rimbert was unanimously elected Archbishop of Hamburg-Bremen. Upon his election, Rimbert travelled with Bishop Theodric of Minden and Abbot Adalgar of Corvey to the court of Louis the German, who sent him to Archbishop Liudbert of Mainz to receive his consecration, which he received with the aid of Luidhard of Paderborn and Thoedric.

Rimbert continued much of the missionary work that had begun under Ansgar, despite the lack of royal or papal support for the missionary effort. As Archbishop, he maintained the poorhouse in Bremen that had been established by Ansgar and founded a monastery at Bücken. He also continued to preach to the Danes at Hedeby. Rimbert furthermore obtained market, coinage and toll rights for the city of Bremen in 888 from Emperor Arnulf of Carinthia and thus considerably improved the financial state of the archbishopric. In 884 he personally led a Frisian army against the Vikings, and following the victorious Battle of Norditi was able to drive them permanently out of East Frisia.

It was also chronicled in the Vita Rimberti that Rimbert had performed numerous miracles, many of which are associated with his missionary work in Sweden. The miracles attributed to him include calming stormy seas, restoring sight to the blind and in one instance, performing an exorcism on the son of Louis the German. While the Vita Rimberti claimed the importance of these miracles and the in the Vita Ansgari, Rimbert claimed that his and Ansgar's missionary work was popular and successful, they nevertheless produced underwhelming results in converting the Scandinavians.

Rimbert is revered as a saint particularly in Frisia. His feast day is 4 February. After Ansgar, known as the Apostle of the North, Rimbert is revered as the Second Apostle of the North, alongside the missionary Sigfrid of Sweden.

== Connections with Ratramnus and Corbie ==
In a highly notable letter from the controversial 9th century theologian, Ratramnus of Corbie, Ratramnus responded to a lost letter from Rimbert regarding the nature of cynocephali. In the letter, Ratramnus gave a response to an account received by Rimbert, while on a mission in Scandinavia. The account told of cynocephali living in the region and that they were living in organised communities. Rimbert had enquired if this in meant that the cynocephali were capable of reason and therefore are 'arose from the line of Adam' making them human and eligible for Christian conversion. In his response, Ratramnus broke with the traditional understanding of cynocephali as animals or monsters and instead declared that they were indeed human and therefore should be converted. This letter highlights the beginning of the change of perception of cynocephali and by extension, Vikings, with whom they were intrinsically linked.

This understanding of cynocephali as human and therefore convertible had profound connotations for Rimbert. Not only was this continued justification for the conversion of his fellow Danes but also had profound prophetic implications. The apocalypse of pseudo-Methodius was one of the most widely read and popular accounts of the apocalypse in 9th century Europe, in which when all people had been converted to Christianity, the monstrous and barbaric people from the North would destroy the world. The prophetic and apocalyptic implications of his work to convert Scandinavian people was not lost Rimbert.

Furthermore, the letter is evident of political connection between the Ansgar and Rimbert and the monks of Corbie. Rimbert aligned himself with the monks at Corbie and sought patronage in West Frankia with Charles the Bald. Similarly, this alliance was underpinned by a common support for ideas of predestination and the ideas of the controversial monk Gotschalk of Orbais. This however, bought Rimbert into an ideological conflict with Hincmar of Rheims who vehemently opposed both ideas of predestination, the humanity of the Cynocephali and questioned the value of the missionary work in Scandinavia.

== Forged foundations of Hamburg-Bremen ==
Prior to Rimbert's election as Archbishop of Hamburg-Bremen the archiepiscopal see of Hamburg-Bremen had not technically existed. Ansgar himself had forged the bishopric of Hamburg, claiming that he had been granted the position by Louis the Pious after he died, a claim uncontested by Louis the German. Ansgar later became an archbishop, though only a missionary archbishop, and such his episcopal see, Hamburg, was only that of a bishop not Archbishop. When Ansgar died and Rimbert assumed the archbishopric in 865, he understood that Hamburg was not large enough for an archiepiscopal see and the Archbishop of Cologne threatened to assert jurisdiction over Bremen, an area Ansgar had exercised some influence though to which he and Rimbert had no claim. This is apparent as several of the accounts that Rimbert gives of the earlier bestowals of the archdiocese are at odds with surviving documentary evidence. Rimbert needed to provide believable context for the forged documents that he and Ansgar used to claim the episcopal justification over Bremen as well as Hamburg. As such, Rimbert wove together in the Vita Ansgari justification for the continuation of the missionary work in Scandinavia and the authority that Ansgar had over Bremen, legitimising the episcopal see of Hamburg-Bremen.

== Literature ==
- Wood, Ian (2014). "The Latin Hagiography of Mission from Rimbert to Bruno of Querfurt". The Cyril and Methodius Mission and Europe: 1150 Years Since the Arrival of the Thessaloniki Brothers in Great Moravia. pp. 34–39. ISBN 978-80-86023-51-9. OS LG 2023-08-18.
- Gilles Gerard Meersseman. Rembert van Torhout. Heiligen van onzen stam., De Kinkhoren, Bruges, 1943, OCLC 781586907.

Rimbert Born: around 830 in Flanders Died: 11 June 888 in Bremen
Catholic Church titles
Preceded by Ansgar	Archbishop of Bremen-Hamburg; 865–888	Succeeded by Adalgar
