= Torvald Hjaltason =

10th-century Icelandic poet

Torvald Hjaltason (Þórvaldr Old Norse: [ˈθoːrˌwɑldz̠ ˈhjɑltɑˌson]; Modern Icelandic: Þorvaldur Hjaltason [ˈθɔrˌvaltʏr ˈçal̥taˌsɔːn]) was a late 10th-century Icelandic skald in the service of the Swedish king Eric the Victorious.

He is listed in Skáldatal as in Eric's service. Styrbjarnar þáttr Svíakappa recounts that he took part in the Battle of the Fýrisvellir against Styrbjörn the Strong and in response to the king's call for verses commemorating the victory, composed in dróttkvætt the following two lausavísur:

Fari* til Fýrisvallar,
folka tungls, hverrs hungrar,
vǫrðr, at virkis garði
vestr kveldriðu hesta.
Þar hefr hreggdrauga hǫggvit
–hóll*aust es þat—sólar
elfar skíðs fyr ulfa
Eirekr í dyn geira.

— Skaldic Poetry of the Scandinavian Middle Ages
Translation:

Let every charger of the ogress [wolf] that hungers go to Fyris-field. There (it is no vaunt) Eric has cut down in battle quarry enough for every one of them.

— Guðbrandur Vigfússon and Frederick York Powell

Illr varð ǫlna fjalla
auðkveðjǫndum beðjar
til Svíþjóðar síðan
sveimr víkinga heiman.
Þat eitt lifir þeira,
—þeir hǫfðu lið fleira—
—gótt vas her at henda
Hundings—es rann undan.

— Skaldic Poetry of the Scandinavian Middle Ages
Translation:

Unlucky was then the vikings' journey from home to Sweden for those who laid claim to the kingdom [themselves]; of their innumerable forces, only those are alive who fled; they had a larger force [than we]; it was easy to seize them [and kill them].

— Finnur Jónsson

These are the only verses attributed to Torvald; the tale says that he received a ring worth half a mark for each verse, and that he is not known to have composed any other verses, either before or after. He may have brought the news of the battle back to Iceland.

He may be the same person as the Torvald Hjaltason who is mentioned with his brother Þórðr in Landnamabók and a number of Sagas of Icelanders, but that Torvald is not said to be a skald.
