= Battle of Fýrisvellir =

980 battle in Sweden

Coordinates: 59°52′19″N 17°36′51″E

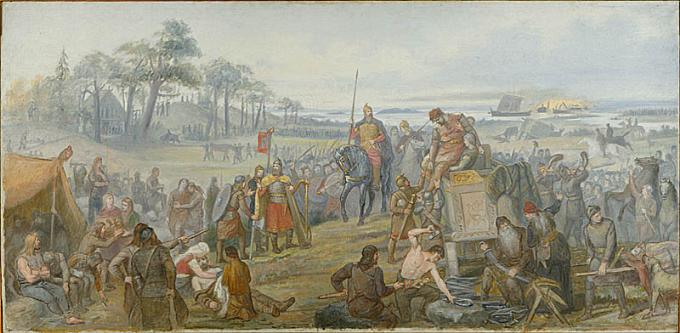
- After the battle of Fýrisvellir, by Mårten Eskil Winge (1888).
Date	985–986
Location	Fýrisvellir near Gamla Uppsala, Sweden
Result	Victory for Eric the Victorious: Death of Styrbjörn the Strong and end of his claim to the throne

Belligerents
The Swedish levy	Jomsvikings; Kingdom of Denmark

Commanders and leaders
Eric the Victorious; Torgny the Lawspeaker	Styrbjörn the Strong †; Tóki Gormsson †

Strength
Thousands	5,000 warriors or more

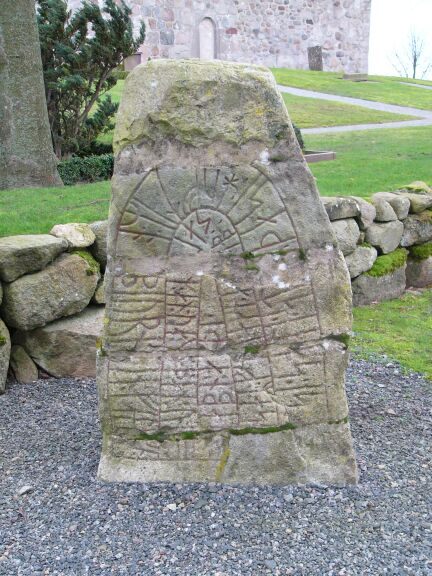
The Sjörup Runestone near Ystad, commemorating a dead son "who did not flee at Uppsala", which has been linked with the Battle of Fýrisvellir

The Battle of Fýrisvellir was fought in the 980s on the plain called Fýrisvellir, where modern Uppsala is situated, between King Eric the Victorious and an invading force. According to Norse sagas, this force was led by his nephew Styrbjörn the Strong. Eric won the battle, and became known as "the Victorious".

It is mentioned by Saxo Grammaticus in Gesta Danorum and in a number of medieval Icelandic sources, including Eyrbyggja saga, Knýtlinga saga, and Hervarar saga. An account is found in the Old Norse translation of Oddr Snorrason's lost Latin life of the Norwegian king Olaf Tryggvason, known as Odds saga munks, and a more detailed account in the short story Styrbjarnar þáttr Svíakappa, which is included in the saga of the Norwegian king Olaf II in Flateyjarbók; this version includes skaldic verses including two lausavísur by Þórvaldr Hjaltason. There are also possible references to the battle on runestones, two of which are in Scania.

The factuality of the battle, and its location, have been disputed. There are however primary sources that support its historicity.

== Old Norse accounts ==
=== Background ===
Styrbjörn the Strong was the son of the Swedish king Olof Björnsson, who had died by poisoning; Styrbjörn suspected his uncle Eric, his father's co-king, of being responsible. Denied the crown by the Swedish Thing, he had made himself the ruler of the Jomsvikings but wanted to amass an even greater force in order to take the crown.

Styrbjörn's method was to pillage far and wide in the newly created kingdom of Denmark until its king Harald Bluetooth asked for a settlement. Harald gave Styrbjörn his daughter Tyra as his wife and Styrbjörn went away, but he then returned to Denmark with 1000 longships and forced the Danes to give him 200 additional ships and whoever among them he saw fit to take with him, including the king himself. He then set sail for Sweden with his armada.

=== Battle ===
When King Eric learned that the navy had entered Mälaren, he sent the fiery cross in all directions and amassed the leidang at Uppsala. Torgny the Lawspeaker advised him to block the waterway leading to Uppsala with a palisade of stakes. When Styrbjörn's navy arrived and saw that they could not sail further, Styrbjörn vowed never to leave Sweden, but to win or die. To encourage his men to fight to the death, he set the ships on fire.

Styrbjörn's forces marched towards Uppsala. When the Swedes attempted to stop their advance in the forest, he threatened to start a forest fire, and this convinced the Swedes to let him and his men pass. Þorgnýr told King Eric to tie together cattle and harness them with spears and swords. When the enemy approached on the Fýrisvellir plain, thralls pushed the herd towards the Jomsvikings, which caused havoc among their ranks. However, Styrbjörn was an excellent warchief and restored order. The fight lasted all that day and the next without either side gaining the upper hand, even though King Eric had received large reinforcements.

According to Styrbjarnar þáttr Svíakappa, during the second night, Styrbjörn sacrificed to Thor, but later a red-bearded man appeared in his camp and spoke a skaldic verse declaring that he was angry at being disturbed by Styrbjörn and foretelling defeat. Eric, on the other hand, went to Odin's hof and sacrificed for victory, promising himself to Odin after ten years. Later that night, a tall man wearing a hat low over his face appeared in his camp and gave Eric a reed; he told him to shoot it over the opposing army and to say Óðinn á yðr alla ("May Odin have you all"). The next day, Eric obeyed Odin's command; the reed appeared to become a javelin as it flew over Styrbjörn's forces, who were all struck blind. Then an avalanche came down from the hillside and buried them all, killing all the Jomsvikings, including Styrbjörn. King Haraldr and the Danes fled back to their ships and sailed home; as they went they saw a spear flying overhead.

The earlier Odds saga munks praises Sturbiornus and states that King Eric killed two-thirds of the large force arrayed against him and that people credited it to "great power of the devil", because he had promised himself to Oddinus after ten years.

Hervarar saga ok Heiðreks (ch. 15), Eyrbyggja saga (ch. 29) and Knýtlinga saga (ch. 2), like Saxo's Gesta Danorum (Book 10, ch. 2), mention Styrbjörn's defeat, but according to Eyrbyggja saga, some Jomsvikings survived, retreating through the forest, and according to Knýtlinga saga, King Haraldr and the Danes left before the battle after Styrbjörn burned his ships. None of these accounts mentions intervention by Odin.

=== Aftermath ===
After the victory, King Eric mounted one of the royal mounds and promised a great reward to whoever could compose a poem about the victory. Among his ranks was an Icelandic skald named Þórvaldr Hjaltason, who immediately composed a poem about the victory, for which the king rewarded him with a golden bracelet.

== Mentions on runestones ==
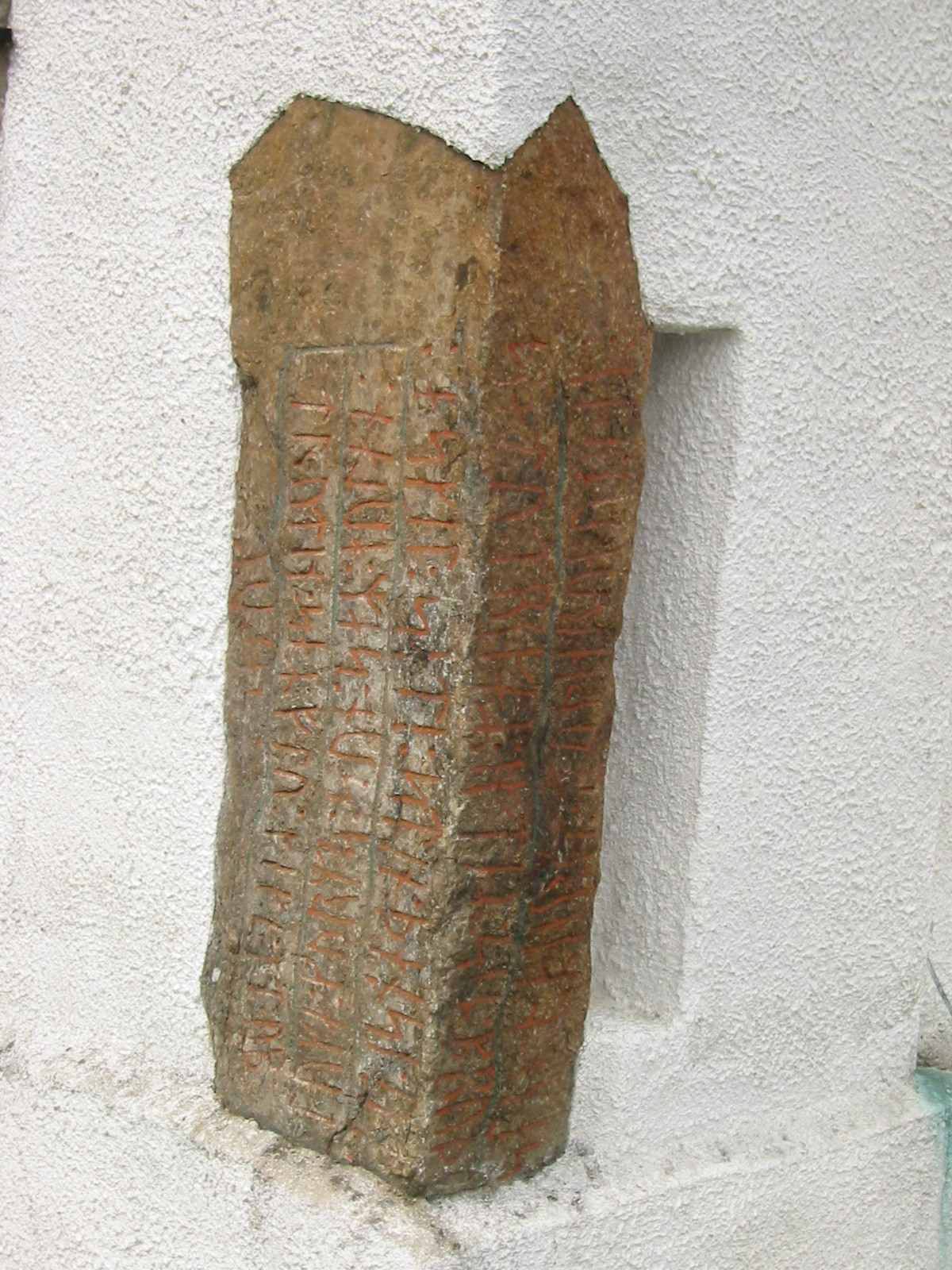
DR 295.

Runestones are counted as historic documents about the events of the Viking Age in Scandinavia. The following four runestones mention people who may have died in the battle. In respect to these runic inscriptions, historian Dick Harrison notes that there are many locations in Scandinavia named Uppsala, but archaeologist Mats G. Larsson comments that the inscriptions can hardly refer to any other location but the then royal seat that was famous all over Northern Europe.

- The Hällestad Runestone DR 295 in Skåne says: "Áskell placed this stone in memory of Tóki Gormr's son, to him a faithful lord. He did not flee at Uppsala. Valiant men placed in memory of their brother the stone on the hill, steadied by runes. They went closest to Gormr's Tóki".
- The Sjörup Runestone, also in Skåne, relates: "Saxi placed this stone in memory of Ásbjörn Tófi's/Tóki's son, his partner. He did not flee at Uppsala, but slaughtered as long as he had a weapon".
- On the Högby Runestone, it says: "The good freeman Gulli had five sons. The brave champion Asmund fell on the Föri".
- The Karlevi Runestone, near the western shore on the island of Öland, was possibly raised by Danish warriors in memory of their war chief, Sibbi, on their way from Uppsala.

== Archaeology ==
Two men of most likely noble descent in Uppsala have been found suffering from sword wounds on their heads. The men, most likely warriors serving King Eric the Victorious, had suffered a violent death in battle close to Uppsala. The two men were buried in ship graves with their pets. Scientists examining the burial speculate that the men died in the battle of Fyrisvellir because the bodies discovered are from the right-time period, the late 900s. The men were raised in Western Scandinavia or the United Kingdom and not in Uppsala or eastern Sweden. It is probable that they travelled to Uppsala for the battle at Fyrisvellir. The ships are typical for Viking ships in Denmark, England and Norway.

The dental tissue in their teeth contain DNA from animals only found in Western Scandinavia and England. The men in question would probably have been buried in their home province in England, Götaland or Norway if not for the violent confrontation at Uppsala.

== Historicity ==
Swedish historian Lauritz Weibull dismissed the Icelandic sagas as sources for the events of the battle. His brother Curt Weibull instead interpreted the runestones and Þórvaldr Hjaltason's verses to indicate that Eric had repelled an invading force of mainly Scanian Vikings led by Tóki Gormsson. Danish archaeologist Lis Jacobsen dated the runestones to a period after Eric's reign, which would leave the skaldic verses as the only reliable source.

Later historians have doubted whether the battle happened at all.
