= Runestones of Högby =

Set of runestones in Sweden

Coordinates: 58.3606°N 15.0997°E

The Runestones of Högby are runestones located in the village of Högby in Östergötland, Sweden, but the name Högby runestone (Swedish: Högbystenen) usually refers to the notable Ög 81. It is famous for its eloquent epitaph in fornyrðislag for all the five sons of a man. The runestone was found when the church was demolished in 1874. Fragments of some other runestones were found as well. The Rundata project dates them to the late 10th century.

The following presentations show the runic inscription transliterated into Latin script, followed by transcriptions into Old East Norse dialect of Old Norse, and it ends with a translation into English.

== Ög 81 ==
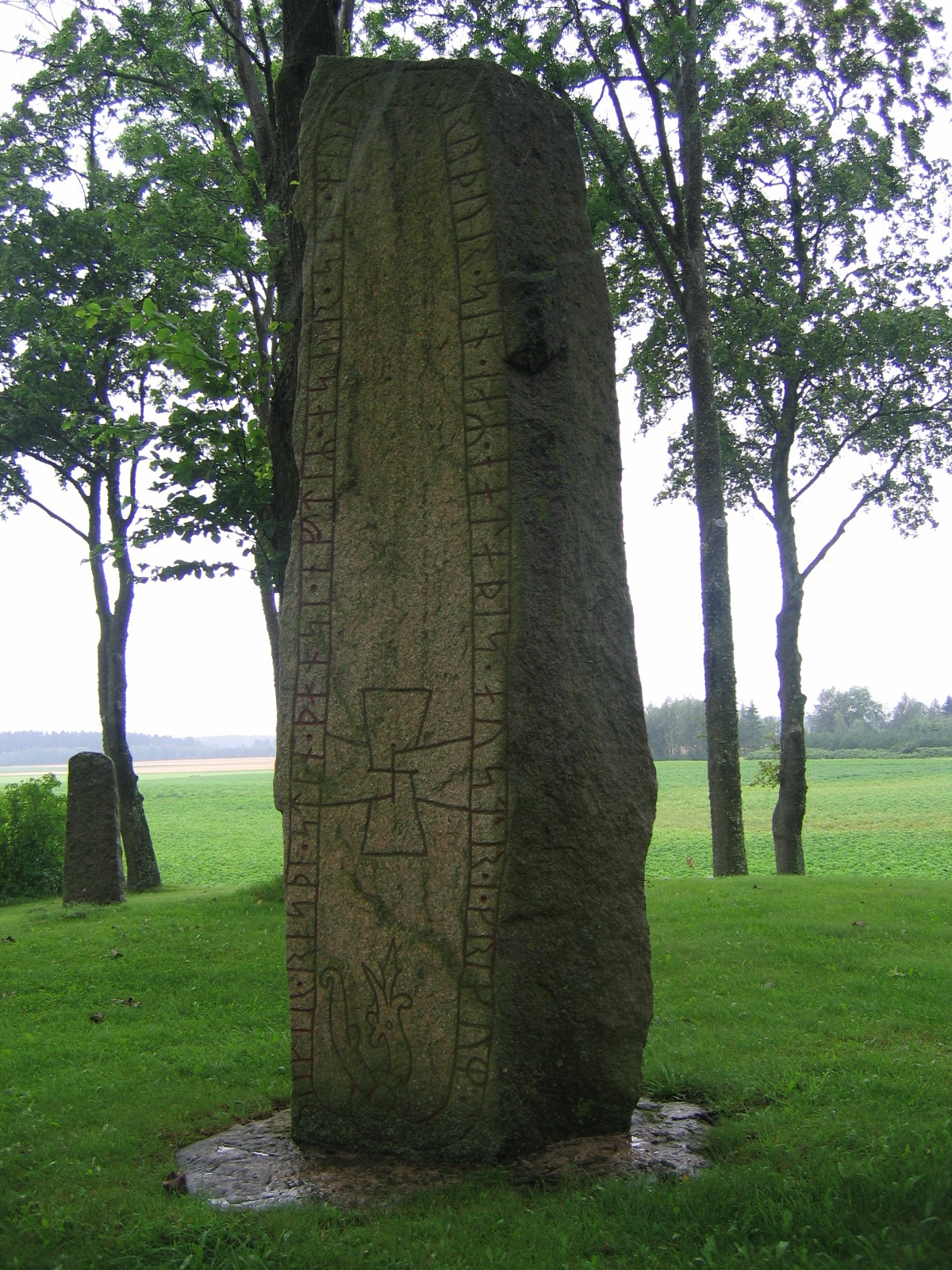
Side A of the runestone

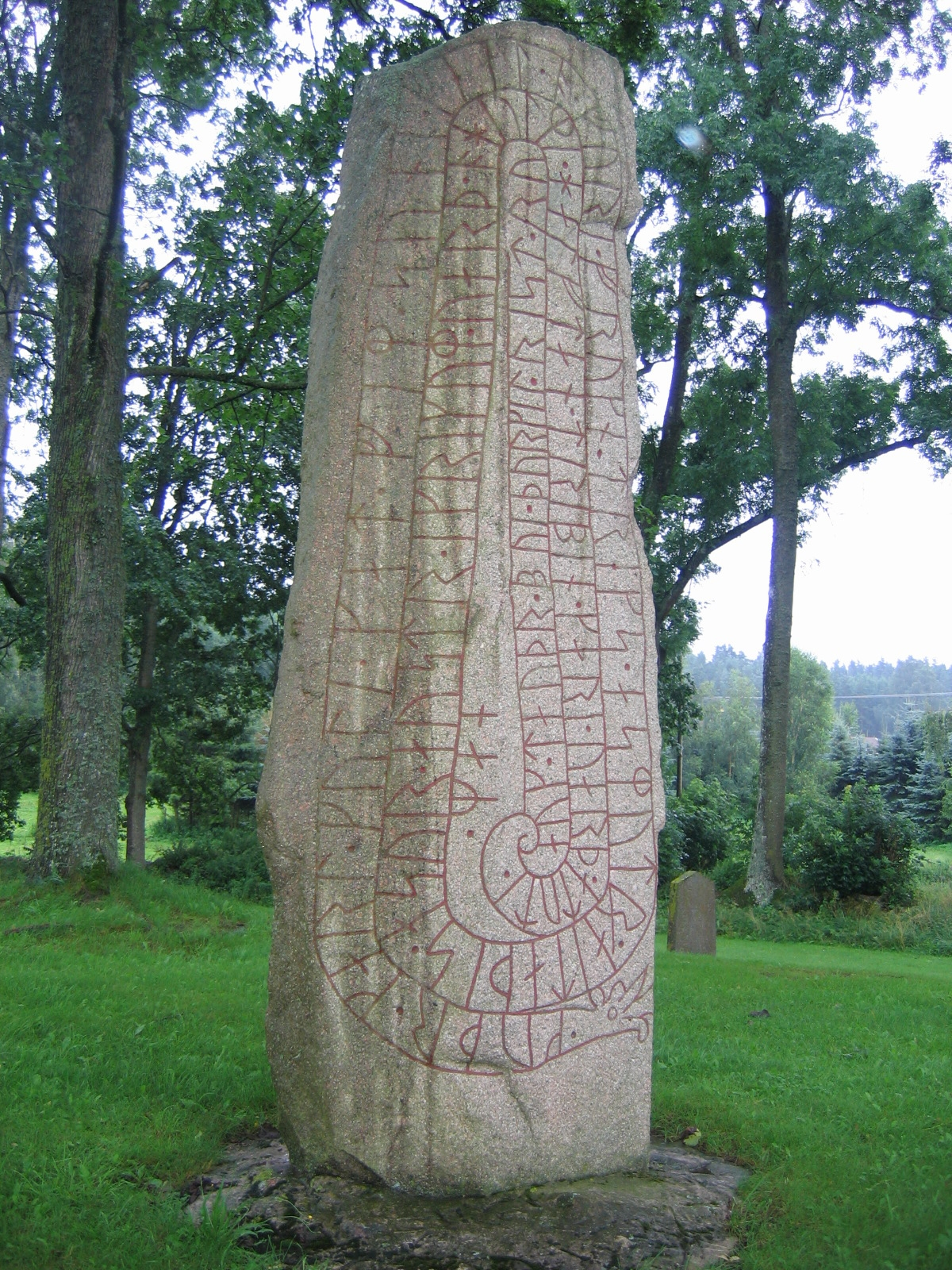
Side B of the runestone

The Högby rune stone is in style Pr1. It commemorates Assur, one of the first Varangians who is known to have died in the service of the Byzantine Emperor, and he is estimated to have died c. 1010, or in the late 10th century. He was one of the sons of the "good man" Gulli, and the rune stone describes a situation that may have been common for Scandinavian families at this time: the stone was made on the orders of Assur's niece Þorgerðr in memory of her uncles who were all dead.

Þorgerðr probably had the stone made as soon as she had learnt that Assur, the last one of her uncles, had died in Greece, and she probably did this to ensure her right of inheritance. On the reverse side of the stone, she inscribed how her other uncles had died in fornyrðislag.

Goðr karl Gulli
gat fæm syni.
Fioll a Føri
frøkn drængʀ Asmundr,
ændaðis Assurr
austr i Grikkium,
varð a Holmi
Halfdan drepinn,
Kari varð at Uddi(?)
ok dauðr Boi.

The good man Gulli
got five sons.
The brave valiant man Ásmundr
fell at Fœri;
Ôzurr met his end
in the east in Greece;
Halfdan was killed
at Holmr (Bornholm?);
Kári was (killed) at Oddr(?);
also dead (is) Búi.

Ásmundr probably died in the Battle of Fýrisvellir, in the 980s, and it was probably on the side of king Eric the Victorious. Assur had entered into the service of a more powerful liege and died for the Byzantine Emperor. Halfdan may have died either on Bornholm or in a holmgang, and where Kári died is not certain either. The most likely interpretation may be that he died on Od, the old name for the north-western cape of Zealand. Búi's location of death is not given, but it was probably in a way which was not as glorious as those of his brothers.

=== Inscription ===
* þukir * resþi * stin * þansi * eftiʀ * asur * sen * muþur*bruþur * sin * iaʀ * eataþis * austr * i * krikum *
{} Þorgærðr(?) {} ræisþi {} stæin {} þannsi {} æftiʀ {} Assur, {} sinn {} moðurbroður {} sinn, {} eʀ {} ændaðis {} austr {} i {} Grikkium. {}
Þorgerðr(?) raised this stone in memory of Ôzurr, her mother's brother. He met his end in the east in Greece.

* kuþr * karl * kuli * kat * fim * syni * feal * o * furi * frukn * treks * asmutr * aitaþis * asur * austr * i krikum * uarþ * o hulmi * halftan * tribin * kari * uarþ * at uti *
{} Goðr {} karl {} Gulli {} gat {} fæm {} syni. {} Fioll {} a {} Føri {} frøkn {} drængʀ {} Asmundr, {} ændaðis {} Assurr {} austr {} i Grikkium, {} varð {} a Holmi {} Halfdan {} drepinn, {} Kari {} varð {} at Uddi(?) {}
The good man Gulli got five sons. The brave valiant man Ásmundr fell at Fœri; Ôzurr met his end in the east in Greece; Halfdan was killed at Holmr (Bornholm?); Kári was (killed) at Oddr(?);

auk * tauþr * bui * þurkil * rist * runaʀ *
ok {} dauðr {} Boi. {} Þorkell {} ræist {} runaʀ. {}
also dead (is) Búi. Þorkell carved the runes.

== Ög 82 ==
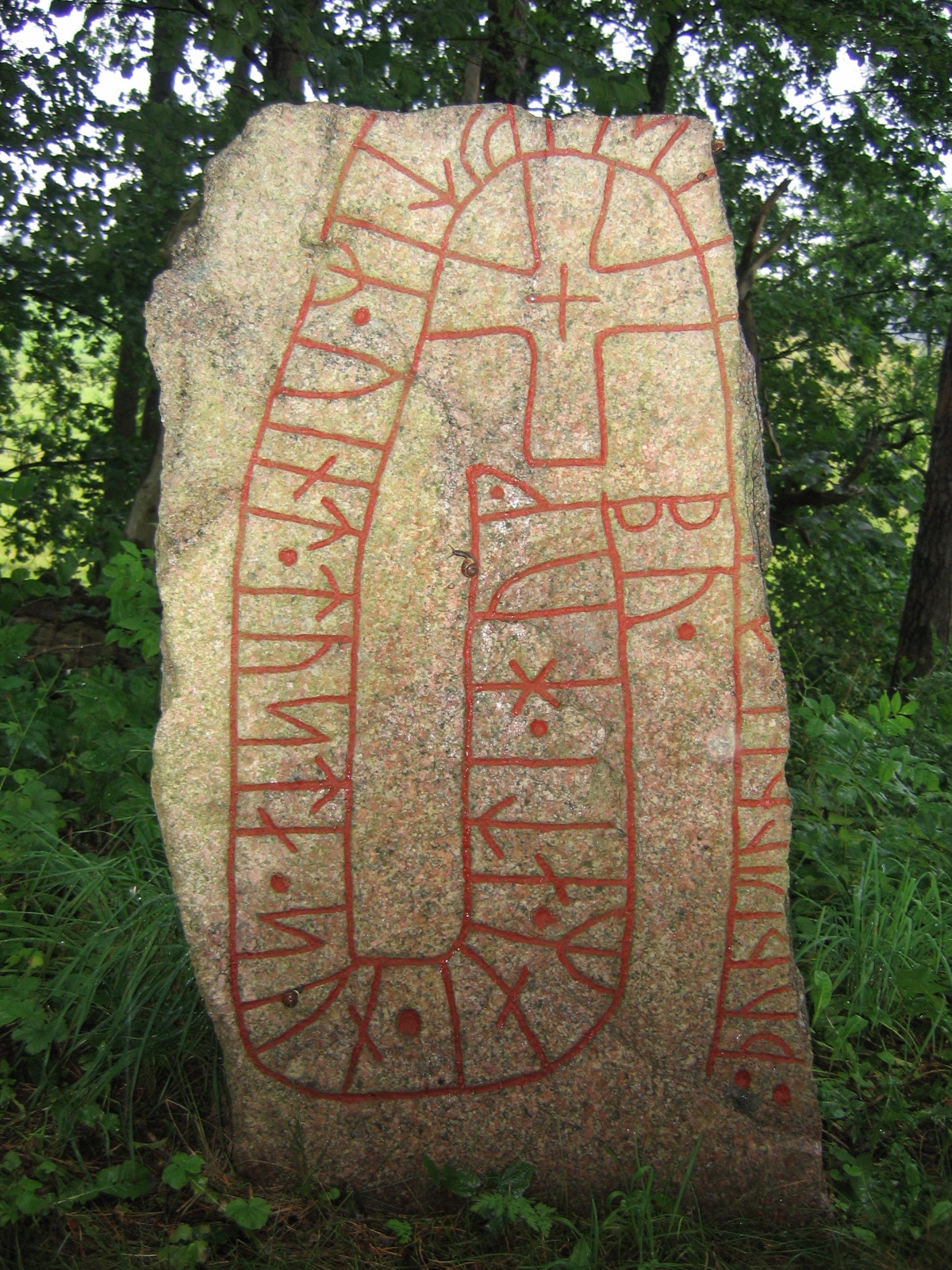
Ög 82

This runestone is in style RAK and it was made in memory of a man who owned or commanded the settlement.

: þurkil (r)(i)-- ---- (þ)(a)s(i) (i)ftiʀ * uint * tusta * sun * iaʀ * ati * hugbu
{} Þorkell ræi[st](?) ... þannsi æftiʀ {} Øyvind, {} Tosta {} sun, {} eʀ {} ati {} Høgby.
Þorkell carved(?) ... this in memory of Eyvindr, Tosti's son, who owned Haugbýr.

== Ög 83 ==
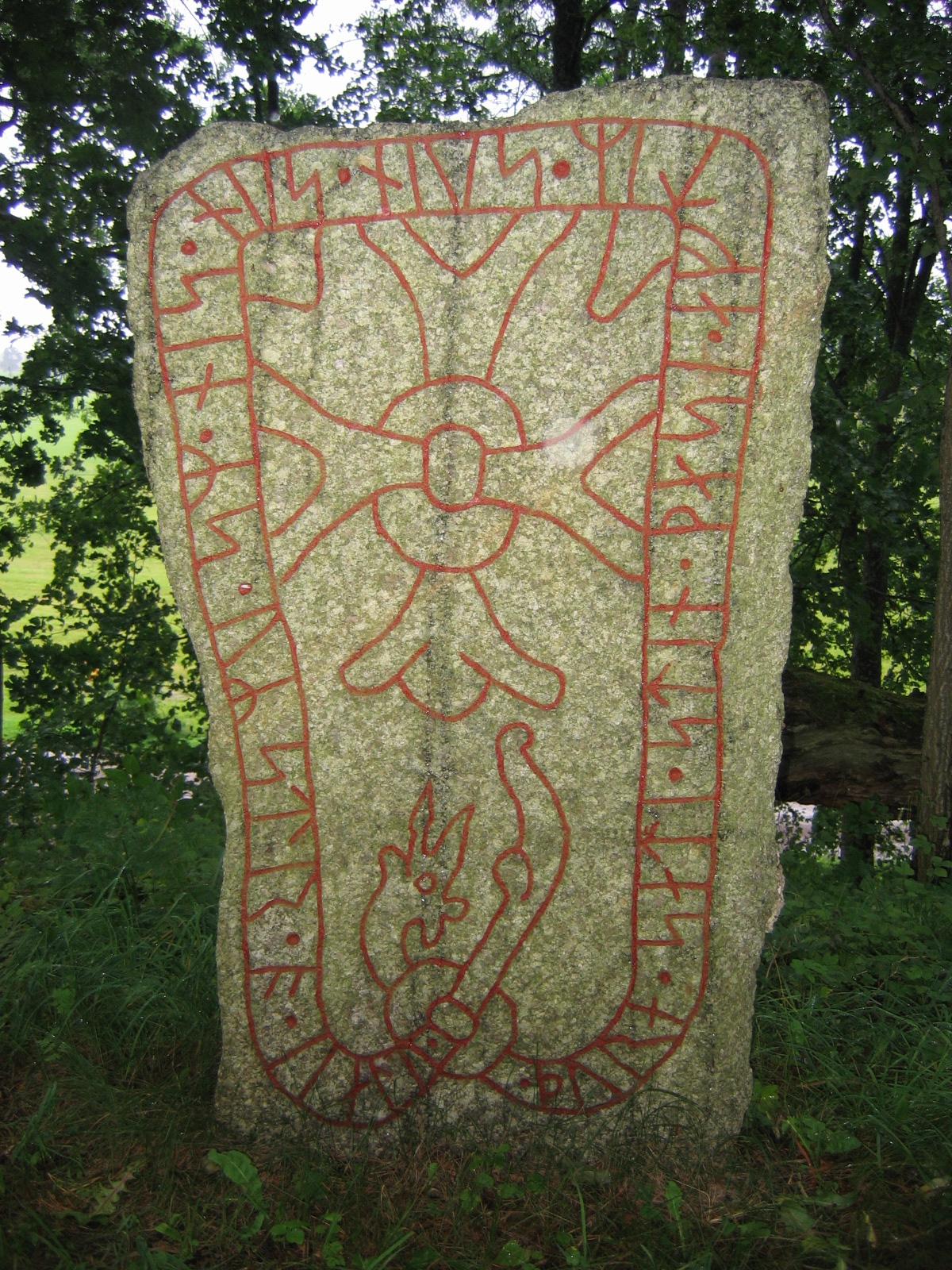
Ög 83

This runestone is tentatively categorized as style Pr1-Pr2 and it was made in memory of a son who died in the West.

* þura * sati * stin * þasi * aftiʀ * suin * sun * sin * ʀs * uʀstr * o * ualu
{} Þora {} satti {} stæin {} þannsi {} æftiʀ {} Svæin, {} sun {} sinn, {} es {} vestr {} a {} <ualu>
Þóra placed this stone in memory of Sveinn, her son, who died in the west in <ualu>.

== See also ==
- Joint Nordic database for runic inscriptions
- List of runestones

== Sources ==
- Brate, Erik (1911). Östergötlands Runinskrifter.
- Larsson, Mats G. (2002). Götarnas Riken : Upptäcktsfärder Till Sveriges Enande. Bokförlaget Atlantis AB ISBN 978-91-7486-641-4
- Pritsak, Omeljan. (1981). The Origin of Rus'. Cambridge, Mass.: Distributed by Harvard University Press for the Harvard Ukrainian Research Institute. ISBN 0-674-64465-4

== External source ==
- Joint Nordic database for runic inscriptions
