= Hróa þáttr heimska =

Short story (þáttr) from Iceland

Hróa þáttr heimska or the Tale of Roi the Fool is a short story (þáttr) from Iceland about a Dane called Hrói the Fool who is helped in a legal dispute by the wise old Swede Þorgnýr the Lawspeaker, and which takes place in the late 10th century. It is preserved in two versions of which one (HróFlat) is found in Flatey Book (GKS 1005 fol 344–348, ca 1387–1395) and the second one (Hró AM 557 4°) in the Skálholtsbók (AM 557 4° 41r-42v, ca 1420–1450) in Copenhagen.

In the version of Óláfs saga helga which is found in the Flatey Book, it is inserted together with Styrbjarnar þáttr Svíakappa in the description of Olaf Haraldsson's wooing of the Swedish princess Ingegerd Olofsdotter. Their purpose appears to be to present the Swedish court, its traditions and Þorgnýr the Lawspeaker.

== Synopsis ==
=== Building a fortune ===
He had one blue eye and one black eye, and he was a skilled smith and trader. However, each time his trade had made him wealthy, he went to sea and lost it all. The third time, he went to king Sweyn and asked him to be his business partner. The king consented although his court advised him not to deal with such an unlucky man as Hrói.

However, the king's good luck prevailed over Hrói's back luck and Hrói became a wealthy man, and one day he shared the wealth with the king and finished their partnership, against the king's wishes who'd rather he stay at the court and marry.

=== The framing ===
Then he went to Sweden and struck a deal with Helgi a red-haired courtier of king Eric the Victorious. However, after the deal had been made and the goods delivered, Hrói came to fetch the merchandise, and discovered that Helgi had tricked him. Helgi said that he had delivered the goods, but Hrói had not been there to fetch them and so Helgi had taken them back. Helgi also stated that Hrói had broken the king's law by not guarding his goods, so that a thief might steal them.

Then Hrói met Helgi's brother Þorgils who took Hrói's knife claiming that Hrói had taken it from him in Normandy. Then he met Helgi's second brother, Þorir, a one-eyed man who claimed that Hrói had taken one of his eyes from him at Samsø with magic and that this was why Hrói had different eyes. Þorir then said that Hrói was to be at the thing and to be sentenced by the king for stealing his eye and for stealing his brother's knife. The two men then parted, but the next day Hrói overheard some men saying that Hrói was about to be before the king and that the king always judged in favour of Helgi and his brothers.

He then met a beautiful girl called Sigrbjörg who had heard of him as Hrói the Fool, and she said that she was the daughter of Þorgnýr the Lawspeaker and that he was no friend of Helgi and his brothers. She then invited Hrói to hide in her bower and to listen what was said. Hrói hid and heard Þorgnýr the Lawspeaker arrive. Þorgnýr asked his daughter if she know whether Hrói would be at the thing the next day. He also asked her why she sighed so heavily and guessed that she had met Hrói and discovered that he was a good man. Þorgnýr said that he would be at the thing the next day and see to it that justice was done against the three brothers. When Þorgnýr was gone, Sigrbjörg told Hrói to join her father the next day.

=== Before the court of the Swedish king ===
The next day Hrói accompanied Þorgnýr the Lawspeaker to the court at Uppsala and Þorgnýr presided the interrogation. On the accusation from Helgi, Hrói answered that he had bought everything that was in the warehouse, but Helgi had not kept his part of the bargain since he had not delivered the moths and the other bugs in it. Consequently, he had the right to have Helgi as his thrall, and this was seconded by Þorgnýr.

On Þorgil's accusation that Hrói had stolen his knife in Normandy, Hrói retorted that he remembered this man and that he had murdered his brother Sigurd. Þorgnýr stated that such men deserved death.

Concerning Þorir's accusation of the stolen eye, Hrói suggested that the stolen eye be removed from his head, and the last eye from Þorir's head. Then the eyes would be weighed and if they weighed equally it would be proven that they came from the same head, and that Hrói had stolen Þorir's eye. If Þorir would not agree to this, he would be proven a liar in this case and in others.

However, Þorir did not agree on this procedure, and so Þorgnýr stated that those three men were wicked and unmanly and had too long weaved webs of lies around them. They had also too long been trusted by the king, and that there was no longer any other decision by the king to make than to give the three brothers as the property of Hrói. King Eric the Victorious agreed. Hrói then sentenced Þorgils and Þorir to death and banished Helgi from Sweden for life.

=== What happened afterwards ===
Hrói asked Þorgnýr for his daughter's hand and married her. He returned to Denmark with his goods and told Swein Forkbeard about the events and gave him many Swedish goods. Hrói and the king would remain friends for life.

However, when Hrói returned to Sweden he found his father-in-law Þorgnýr the Lawspeaker dead, but his son Þorgnýr had succeeded him as lawspeaker, and this Þorgnýr was the wisest of men. Hrói and his brother-in-law Þorgnýr the Lawspeaker shared the inheritance in concord and Hrói was considered by all to be an excellent man. Many Swedish noble families were descended from him.
