= Styrbjarnar þáttr Svíakappa =

Short story

The Tale of Styrbjörn the Swedish Champion
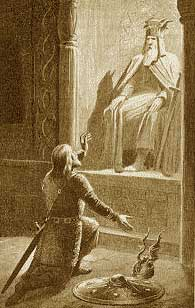
- Eric the Victorious praying to Odin before the Battle of the Fýrisvellir, c 985, by Jenny Nyström. An illustration for a Swedish translation of Styrbjarnar þáttr Svíakappa, in Ekermann's Fornnordiska sagor (1895).
- Original title: Styrbjarnar þáttr Svíakappa
- Date: c. 1387-1395
- Manuscript(s): Flatey Book (GKS 1005 fol 342-344)
- Genre: Þáttr

Styrbjarnar þáttr Svíakappa (The Tale of Styrbjörn the Swedish Champion) is a short story, a þáttr on the Swedish claimant and Jomsviking Styrbjörn the Strong preserved in the Flatey Book (GKS 1005 fol 342-344, ca 1387-1395).

It is inserted together with Hróa þáttr heimska in the description of Olaf Haraldsson's wooing of the Swedish princess Ingegerd Olofsdotter. Their purpose appears to be to present the Swedish court, its traditions and Þorgnýr the Lawspeaker.

In the story, Styrbjörn becomes the leader of the Jomsvikings and makes war against the Danes, until he makes peace with the Danish king Haraldr Gormsson who in return gave Styrbjörn his daughter and 100 ships.

However, Styrbjörn is not happy with the agreement and attacks Denmark with an even larger fleet and forces king Harald to give him 200 ships and the king himself as a hostage.

Styrbjörn goes back to Sweden to take the Swedish throne. Styrbjörn has sacrificed to Thor, but Eric the Victorious has sacrificed to Odin and has promised to belong to Odin within ten years if he wins.

When the forces meet, Þorgnýr the Lawspeaker has created an ingenious war machine by tying horses and cows together with spears and spikes. This war machine wreaks havoc among the Jomsvikings. After three days of battle, Eric throws his spear over the Danes and cries "I give you all to Odin", and a landslide and a rain of Odin's arrows kill Styrbjörn and his men.
