= Torgny the Lawspeaker =

Fictional character

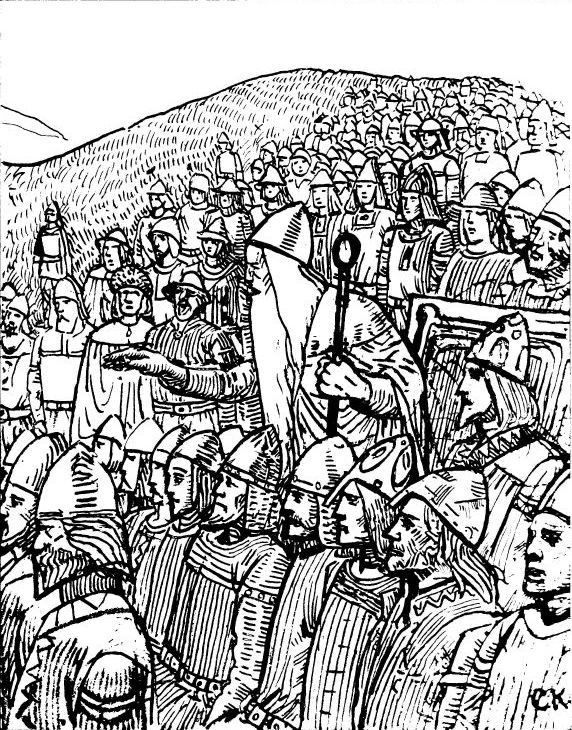
Torgny Lagmann speaks at Uppsala, by C. Krohg.

Torgny the Lawspeaker (Old Icelandic: Þorgnýr lögmaðr [ˈθorˌɡnyːr ˈlɵɣˌmɑðr], Swedish: Torgny Lagman) is the name of one of at least three generations of lawspeakers by the name Þorgnýr, who appear in the Heimskringla by the Icelandic scholar and chieftain Snorri Sturluson, and in the less known Styrbjarnar þáttr Svíakappa and Hróa þáttr heimska. They were the lawspeakers of Tiundaland, and all lawspeakers in the Swedish kingdom were their subordinates.

The one who is the most famous is reported by the Heimskringla to have lived in the time of Olof Skötkonung and Olav the Holy, and there is an extensive account on him in this source. This Þorgnýr is held to have historic basis, but Snorri's account is doubted by modern Swedish historians, who lack native Swedish documentation on the Tiundaland lawspeakers of this time.

Snorri relates:

In Tiundaland there was a lagman [lawspeaker] who was called Thorgny, whose father was called Thorgny Thorgnyson. His forefathers had for a long course of years, and during many kings' times, been lagmen of Tiundaland. At this time Thorgny was old, and had a great court about him. He was considered one of the wisest men in Sweden, and was Earl Ragnvald's relation and foster-father.

The two kings were at war, and many wise men in both Sweden and Norway tried to reconcile the kings. In 1018, the earl Ragnvald Ulfsson and the Norwegian king's emissaries Björn Stallare and Halte Skeggesson had arrived at the thing of Uppsala to sway the Swedish king to accept peace and as a warrant marry his daughter Ingegerd Olofsdotter to the king of Norway.

The Swedish king was greatly angered and threatened to banish Ragnvald from his kingdom, but Ragnvald was supported by his foster-father Þorgnýr the Lawspeaker, who was the wisest and most respected man in Sweden.

Then Thorgny stood up; and when he arose all the bondes [yeomen] stood up who had before been sitting, and rushed together from all parts to listen to what Lagman Thorgny would say. At first there was a great din of people and weapons; but when the noise was settled into silent listening, Thorgny made his speech.

The disposition of Swedish kings is different now from what it has been formerly. My grandfather Thorgny could well remember the Upsala king Eirik Eymundson, and used to say of him that when he was in his best years he went out every summer on expeditions to different countries, and conquered for himself Finland, Kirjalaland, Courland, Estonia, and the eastern countries all around; and at the present day the earth-bulwarks, ramparts, and other great works which he made are to be seen. And, more over, he was not so proud that he would not listen to people who had anything to say to him. My father, again, was a long time with King Bjorn, and was well acquainted with his ways and manners. In Bjorn's lifetime his kingdom stood in great power, and no kind of want was felt, and he was gay and sociable with his friends. I also remember King Eirik the Victorious, and was with him on many a war-expedition. He enlarged the Swedish dominion, and defended it manfully; and it was also easy and agreeable to communicate our opinions to him. But the king we have now got allows no man to presume to talk with him, unless it be what he desires to hear. On this alone he applies all his power, while he allows his scat-lands [territories paying protection money to the Swedes] in other countries to go from him through laziness and weakness. He wants to have the Norway kingdom laid under him, which no Swedish king before him ever desired, and therewith brings war and distress on many a man. Now it is our will, we bondes, that thou King Olaf make peace with the Norway king, Olaf the Thick, and marry thy daughter Ingegerd to him. Wilt thou, however, reconquer the kingdoms in the east countries which thy relations and forefathers had there, we will all for that purpose follow thee to the war. But if thou wilt not do as we desire, we will now attack thee, and put thee to death; for we will no longer suffer law and peace to be disturbed. So our forefathers went to work when they drowned five kings in a morass at the Mora Thing, and they were filled with the same insupportable pride thou hast shown towards us. Now tell us, in all haste, what resolution thou wilt take.

Then the whole public approved, with clash of arms and shouts, the lagman's speech.

These arguments convinced the king to give in and he promised to have peace with the king of Norway and to give him his daughter. However, he later broke his promise.

In Styrbjarnar þáttr Svíakappa about Styrbjörn Starke, appears a Þorgnýr the Lawspeaker who is probably the father of the previously mentioned Þorgnýr. This Þorgnýr the Lawspeaker was very old and almost blind and so he could not take part in the battle between Eric the Victorious and Styrbjörn. Still he influenced the course of battle by having cattle and horses driven against the Danish army. These animals were harnessed with spears and spikes and caused many casualties in Styrbjörn's army. This Þorgnýr is also mentioned in Hróa þáttr heimska as a wise and just old man.

== Sources ==
- Theodor Wisén; Birger Nerman (1920), "Torgny", Nordisk familjebok
- Lagerquist, Lars O. (1997). Sveriges Regenter, från forntid till nutid. Norstedts, Stockholm. ISBN 91-1-963882-5
- Thunberg, Carl L. (2012). Slaget på Fyrisvallarna i ny tolkning. University of Gothenburg/CLTS. ISBN 978-91-981859-5-9
