= Eric (Swedish king 852) =

Proto-historic King of the Swedes
- Reign: c. 852
- Predecessor: Björn
- Successor: Olof
- House: Munsö (?)

Eric (Old Norse: Eiríkr, Swedish: Erik) was a Swedish monarch or local ruler who ruled over Birka, an important port town, and possibly Uppsala, an important early Swedish political center, and is mentioned as dead by 852. His existence is attested by the nearly contemporary account Vita Ansgari, written by the missionary Rimbert, who visited Sweden alongside Ansgar in c. 852. By the time of their visit, a king by the name Olof ruled, with Eric being deceased since a while (Lat. dudum, which can also mean long ago).

== Elevation to divine status ==
Eric appears to have been a popular king; according to Rimbert's writings, some of the Anti-Christian Swedes suggested that Eric be worshipped as a god alongside the rest of the Nordic pantheon instead of the new Christian god the missionaries were attempting to introduce in Sweden. As the Vita Ansgari puts it:

"It happened, at the instigation of the devil, who knew beforehand of the coming of this good man [Ansgar], that someone had come thither and said that he had been present at a meeting of the gods, who were believed to be the owners of this land, and had been sent by them to make this announcement to the king and the people: 'You, I say, have long enjoyed our goodwill, and under our protection the land in which you dwell has long been fertile and has had peace and prosperity. You have also duly sacrificed and performed the vows made to us, and your worship has been well pleasing to us. But now you are keeping back the usual sacrifices and are slothful in paying your freewill offerings; you are, moreover, displeasing us greatly by introducing a foreign god in order to supplant us. If you desire to enjoy our goodwill, offer the sacrifices that have been omitted and pay greater vows. And do not receive the worship of any other god, who teaches that which is opposed to our teaching, nor pay any attention to his service. Furthermore, if you desire to have more gods and we do not suffice, we will agree to summon your former King Eric [Ericum quondam regem vestrum] to join us so that he may be one of the gods.' This devilish announcement, which was publicly made on the arrival of the bishop, disturbed the minds of all, and their hearts were deceived and disquieted. For they had resolved to have a temple in honour of the late king [supradicti regis dudum defuncti], and had begun to render votive offerings and sacrifices to him as to a god."

== Interpretations ==
The vagueness of the text as to when Eric actually reigned has led to speculations that he may be identified with any of the kings named Eric who are mentioned in the saga literature. Among the candidates are Erik Björnsson and Erik Refilsson who are however only known from the late Langfeðgatal and Heidreks Saga. There have also been attempts to link him with the ruler Eric who is mentioned on the Sparlösa Runestone from c. 800. The alleged elevation to divine status has been interpreted as an attempt to unite various factions in society through referring to a revered royal ancestral figure. The temple erected in honour of Eric has also been tentatively linked with the much-debated Uppsala temple which is mentioned in an 11th-century source.

== See also ==
- Christianization of Sweden
- House of Munsö
