= Negau helmets =

Etruscan combat helmet discovered in modern Slovenia

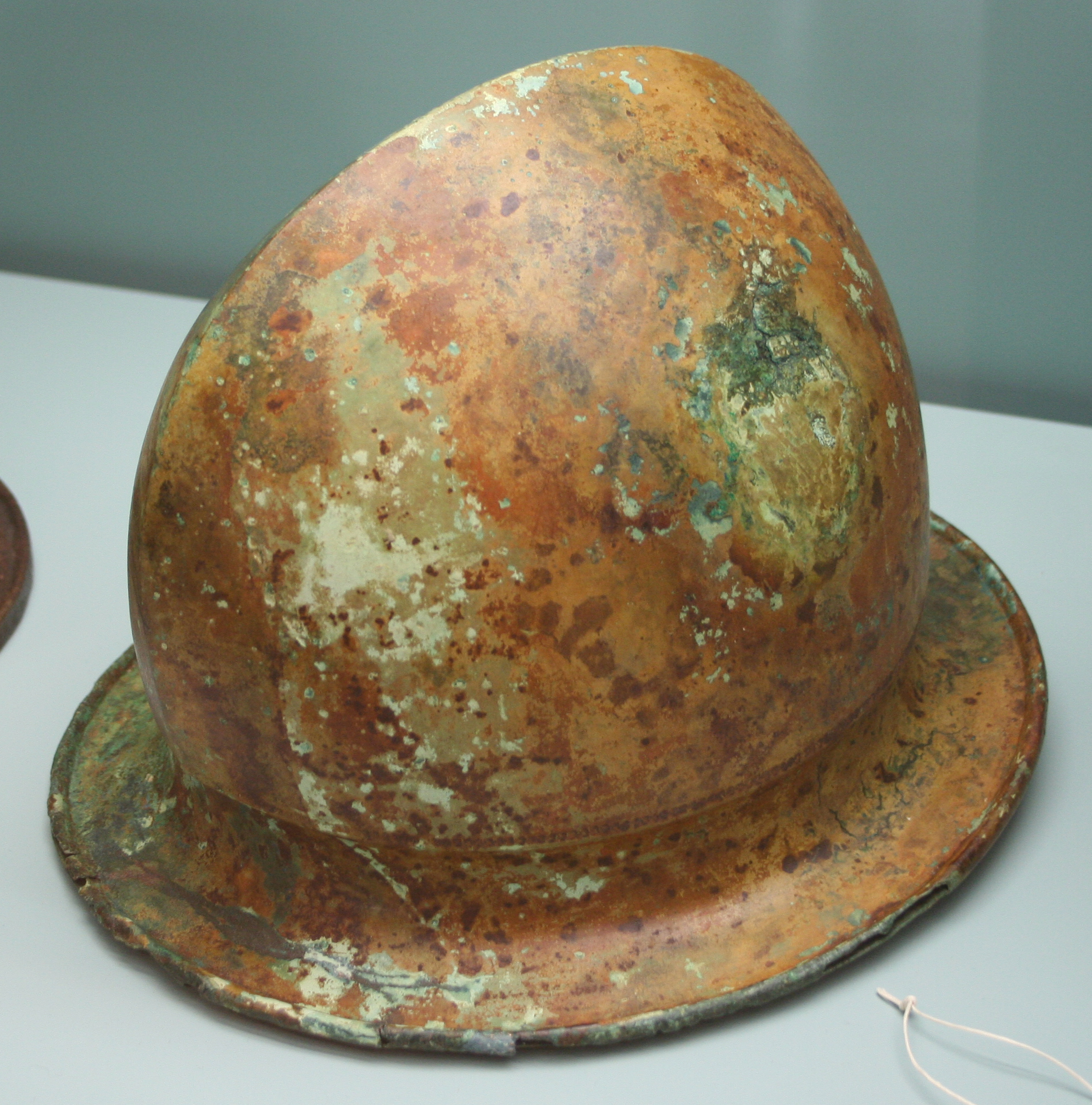
A Negau helmet excavated at Hallstatt Archaeological Site in Vače, near Vače, Slovenia. Kept by Museum of Prehistory and Early History (Berlin).

The Negau helmets are 26 bronze helmets (23 of which are preserved) dating to c. 450 BC–350 BC, found in 1812 in a cache in Ženjak, near Negau, Duchy of Styria (now Negova, Slovenia). The helmets are of typical Etruscan vetulonic shape, sometimes described as of the Negau type. It is not clear when they were buried, but they seem to have been left at the Ženjak site for ceremonial reasons. The village of Ženjak was of great interest to German archaeologists during the Nazi period and was briefly renamed Harigast during World War II. The site has never been excavated properly.

== Discovery ==
The helmets were discovered by Jurij Slaček while he was clearing land for farming. Slaček found the 26 helmets stacked inside each other. He broke one helmet during a test, and sold the remaining 25 to Johann Denzl, a coppersmith in nearby Moribar. When Archduke John of Austria learned of the discovery, he sought the helmets for the Universalmuseum Joanneum. Denzl sent the museum 17 helmets, having previously sold or processed the other eight. 12 of the helmets were transferred to the Kunsthistorisches Museum in Vienna.

Six of the eight missing helmets were gradually identified. One of the helmets was previously owned by Ludwig Michael Schwanthaler. Another helmet had been housed at Saint Paul's Abbey, Lavanttal until 1932. The remaining two missing helmets are thought to have been melted down by Denzl shortly after he acquired them.

== Inscriptions ==
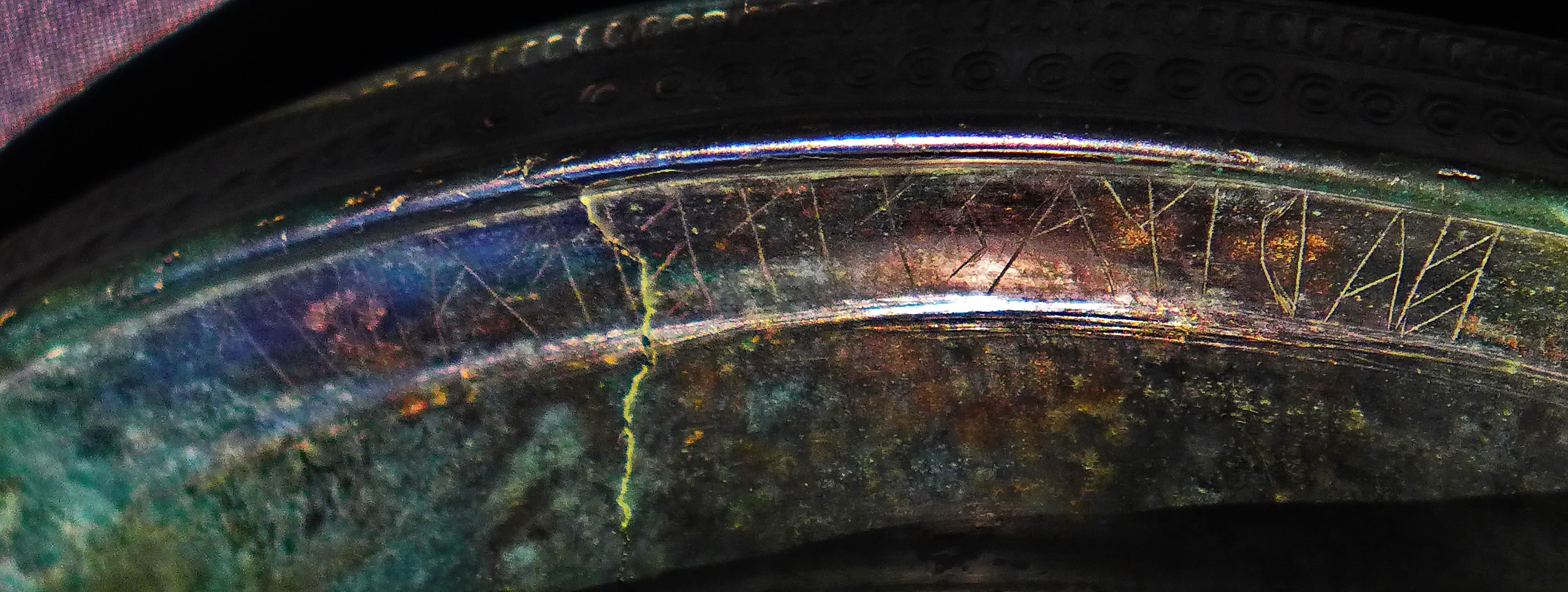
Inscription on helmet Negau B. The inscription reads right to left.

On one of the helmets ("Negau B"), there is an inscription in a northern Etruscan alphabet. The date of the inscription is unclear, but it may be as old as 350–300 BC (Teržan 2012). It is read, right to left, as:

𐌇𐌀𐌓𐌉𐌙𐌀𐌔𐌕𐌉𐌕𐌄𐌉𐌅𐌀///𐌉𐌐
hariχastiteiva\\\ip

Many interpretations of the inscription have been proffered in the past, but the most recent interpretation is by Tom Markey (2001), who reads the inscription as Hariχasti teiva, 'Harigast the priest' (from *teiwaz 'god'), as another inscribed helmet also found at the site bears several names (mostly Celtic) followed by religious titles. Markey believes the text is Germanic mediated through Rhaetic which accounts for some of the difficulties in the reading, such as the lack of a declensional ending in the first element Hariχasti. In any case, the Germanic name Harigasti(z) is almost universally read. Formerly, some scholars have seen the inscription as an early incarnation of the runic alphabet, but it is now accepted that the script is North Etruscan proper, and precedes the formation of the Runic alphabet.

This inscription has been of particular interest to historical linguists, since it has been argued that it provides the earliest attestation of Grimm's law (also known as the First Germanic Sound Shift), the sound shift which distinguishes the Germanic languages from other Indo-European languages. If teiva is a Germanic cognate of Latin deus 'god', it would reflect Grimm's shift *d > *t. This would be the earliest attestation of the shift, which would have relevance for the dating.

However, according to Jeremy J. Smith, two issues remain for this interpretation: (i) the interpretation of teiva is not secure, as it could be a second personal name, and (ii) Germanic people of the time generally preferred leather caps over metal helmets, though there are later parallels for this practice even among Germanic individuals, and it may have been adopted from the Celts. For comparison, the four discrete inscriptions on another helmet, usually called "Negau A", are probably in a Celtic language. For these, Markey (2001) has proposed the readings: Dubni banuabi 'of Dubnos the pig-slayer'; sirago turbi 'astral priest of the troop'; Iars'e esvii 'Iarsus the divine'; and Kerup, probably an abbreviation for a Celtic name like Cerubogios.

== See also ==
- Meldorf fibula
