= Meldorf fibula =

Ancient Germanic brooch

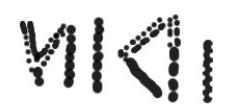
Rendition of the inscription from the Meldorf fibula. (cf. Düwel (1981), p.160)

The Meldorf fibula is a Germanic spring-case-type fibula found in Meldorf, Schleswig-Holstein in 1979. Though the exact circumstances of the recovery of the fibula are unknown, it is thought to have come from a cremation grave, probably that of a woman. On typological grounds it has been dated to the first half of the first century CE, and possibly bears the oldest runic inscription found to date.

== Inscription ==
The inscription, found on the fibula's foot and carried out in the tremolo or assay puncture technique, remains the subject of lively debate. The controversy revolves primarily around whether the graphemes are to be understood as runic, proto-runic or Latin characters. Finds from Vimose – particularly a comb with the inscription harja dated to ca. 160 CE – are generally considered to be the oldest runic artifacts yet found. If the inscription on the Meldorf fibula is runic, then it has far-reaching implications regarding the question as to the origin and development of the Elder Futhark.

=== Interpretations ===
Düwel and Gebühr (1981) suggest that the inscription contains four runes, reading (left to right) hiwi, which they interpret as meaning 'for the spouse' or 'mater familias'. Attested cognates and related words would include: Old Saxon and Old High German hīwa, 'spouse'; Old Saxon and Old High German hīwiski, 'family'; Old Saxon hīwian and Old High German hīwan, 'to marry'; Gothic heiwa- in heiwa-frauja, 'master of the house' or 'husband'. This interpretation has been widely criticised as epigraphically and linguistically irregular, however (Odenstedt 1989, Mees 1997).

Düwel's interpretation gained renewed attention with the discovery of Wijnaldum B, a small golden pendant of possibly Mediterranean origin dated to ca. 600 CE, in Wijnaldum, Friesland in 1953 and 1990. On the back is a runic inscription which Looijenga (1997) and Düwel (2001) took to read as hiwi, 'for the mater familias'. Looijenga (2021:383, n.7) has since withdrawn her reading of the inscription, however, seeing it now as only featuring meaningless scratches.

Odenstedt (1989) interprets the inscription as being composed in the Latin alphabet, reading (right to left) IDIN, which he translates as a personal name, the gender of which remains uncertain; if feminine 'for Ida', if masculine, 'for Iddo'. Seebold (1994) also agrees with this interpretation.

Mees (1997), like Düwel, interprets the inscription as runic, but instead reads (right to left) iṛiḷi, which he translates as 'to the (rune-)master'.

Other possible readings include Latin nidi, runic or Latin irih, hiri, or runic iwih, iþih, hiþi.

The fibula is kept in Gottorp, Schleswig-Holstein.

== See also ==
- Negau helmet
- Archaeology of Northern Europe
