= Noleby Runestone =

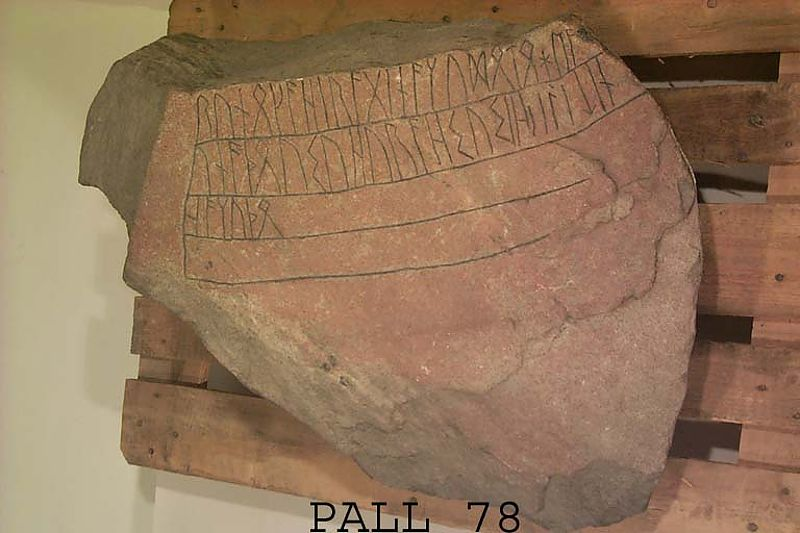

The Noleby Runestone, which is also known as the Fyrunga Runestone or Vg 63 for its Rundata catalog listing, is a runestone in Proto-Norse which is engraved with the Elder Futhark. It was discovered in 1894 at the farm of Stora Noleby in Västergötland, Sweden.

== Description ==
The Noleby Runestone was dated by Sophus Bugge to about 600 AD, and cannot be dated any younger than about 450 AD due to its language and rune forms. It is notable because of its inscription runo [...] raginakundo which means "runes of divine origin" and which also appears in the later Sparlösa Runestone and the eddic poem Hávamál. This is of importance for the study of Norse mythology since it indicates that the expressions and the contents of the Poetic Edda are indeed of pre-historic Scandinavian origin.

The runic inscription consists of three lines of text between bands, with the second line considered untranslatable and often listed as being a "meaningless formula". The Noleby is the only runestone in Scandinavia that uses the star rune form ᛡ for /j/ rather than for /a/ or /h/. The name Hakoþuz in the last line of the inscription is believed to mean "crooked one", although other interpretations have been suggested.

The Noleby Runestone is now located in the Swedish Museum of National Antiquities in Stockholm.

== Inscription ==
Below follows a presentation of the runestones based on the Rundata project. The transcriptions into Old Norse are in the Swedish and Danish dialect to facilitate comparison with the inscriptions, while the English translation provided by Rundata gives the names in the de facto standard dialect (the Icelandic and Norwegian dialect):

runo fahi raginakudo toj-a {¶ unaþou ÷ suhurah : susi(h)—tin ¶} hakuþo
Runo fahi raginakundo toj[e'k]a. ... Hakoþuz.
"I prepare the suitable divine rune ... for Hakoþuz."

== See also ==
- Jēran

== Other sources ==
- The article Fyrungastenen in Nordisk familjebok (1908).
