= Vimose inscriptions =

Inscriptions from small bog in northwest Funen, Denmark

Coordinates: 55°23′55″N 10°23′30″E

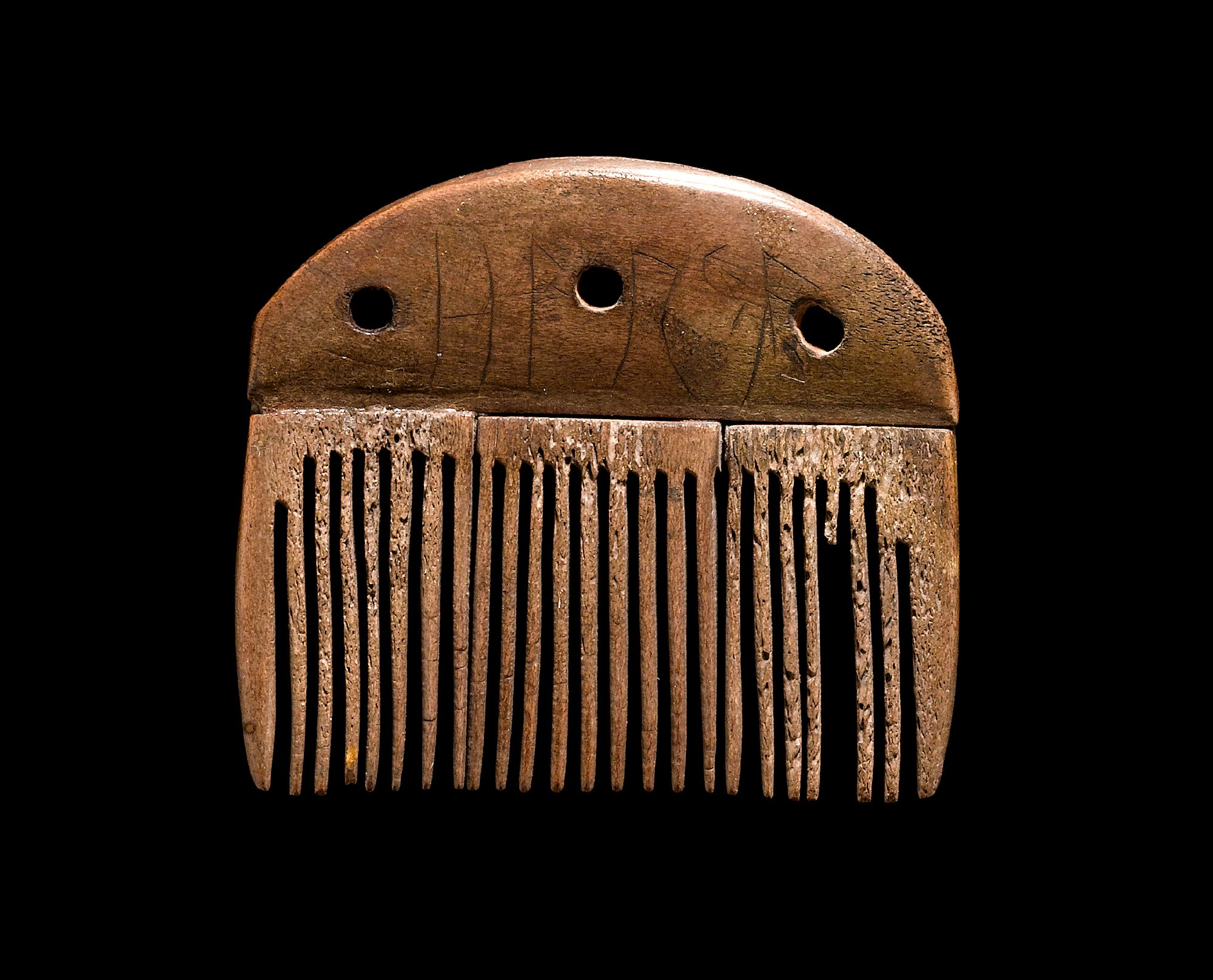
The Vimose Comb is housed at the National Museum of Denmark.

The Vimose inscriptions (Danish pronunciation: [ˈvimoːsə]), found on the island of Funen, Denmark, include some of the oldest datable Elder Futhark runic inscriptions in early Proto-Norse or late Proto-Germanic from the 2nd to 3rd century in the Scandinavian Iron Age and were written in the time of the Roman Empire.

- Vimose Comb (c. 160, considered the oldest known datable runic inscription altogether): harja (ᚺᚨᚱᛃᚨ)
- Vimose Buckle (c. 200) aadagasu =? ansuz-a(n)dag-a(n)su / laasauwija =? la-a[n]sau-wija;
- Vimose Chape (c. 250): mariha || [.]ala / makija; possibly "Mari (the famous one) is the sword of Alla"
- Vimose Woodplane (c. 300) talijo gisai oj: wiliz [..]la o[...] / tkbis: hleuno: an[.]: regu
- Vimose Sheathplate (c. 300): awgns; possibly "son/descendant of Awa"
- Vimose Spearhead: [w]agni[ŋ]o

== See also ==
- Illerup, a site of wetland depositions
- Meldorf fibula, an item bearing an early runic inscription
- Thorsberg moor, a site of wetland depositions
- Wetlands and islands in Germanic paganism, religious importance of wetlands and depositions
