= Sparlösa Runestone =

Swedish runestone

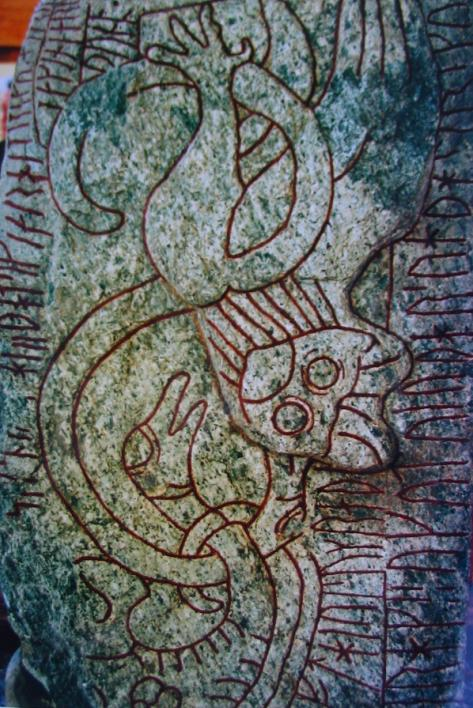
- Writing: between Elder and Younger Futhark
- Created: 800
- Discovered: c. 1669; Sparlösa, Västergötland, Sweden
- Rundata ID: Vg 119
- Runemaster: Alrik and/or Gisli

Text – Native
- Old Norse : See article.

Translation
- See article

The Sparlösa Runestone, listed as Vg 119 in the Rundata catalog, is located in Västergötland and is the second most famous Swedish runestone after the Rök runestone.

== Description ==
The Sparlösa Runestone was discovered in 1669 in the southern wall of the church at Sparlösa, now part of Vara Municipality. Before their historical value was understood, many runestones were used as construction material for roads, walls, and bridges. Following a fire at the church in 1684, the runestone was split in rebuilding the wall. It was removed from the wall in 1937 and the two sections reunited.

The stone is 1.77 metres tall and roughly rectangular in shape, with a nearly square cross-section. It is dated to about 800 AD based upon its transitional use of rune forms from both the elder and younger futhark, but it has a probably younger line added to it saying Gisli made this memorial after Gunnar, his brother. The dating is based on the style of the images, such as a ship, which suggest the 8th century, like similar images from Gotland. However, a sail on the ship suggests a later dating than the 8th century.

The runestone is famous for its depictions and its tantalizing and mysterious references to a great battle, the names Eric and Alrik, the father who resided in Uppsala and the text descending from the gods. The stone provides an early attestation of the place name Uppsala, and the two personal names Erik ("complete ruler") and Alrik ("everyone's ruler") are both royal names, known to have been worn by the semi-legendary Swedish Yngling dynasty at Uppsala. Moreover, the mention of a great battle is suggestive of the equally semi-legendary Swedish-Geatish wars that are mentioned in Beowulf.

The words runaʀ ræginkundu meaning "runes of divine origin" are also in the runic text on the Noleby Runestone and would appear in stanza 79 of the Hávamál of the Poetic Edda several centuries later.

The runestone has figurative carvings on all four faces, three of which also contain runic inscriptions. One face depicts a building above a crescent-shaped sailing ship with two birds and a cross-shaped mark on its sail. Below the ship are several animals and a mounted figure holding a drawn sword. Another face features two birds entangled with snakes, one resembling an owl. A third face contains spiral carvings and what has been interpreted as part of a human face. The remaining face depicts a human figure beneath a horizontal band decorated with cross-shaped marks. It also contains a line of unusually tall runes and a later inscription along its edge.

Several interpretations of the imagery have been proposed.

In 1954, archaeologist Eric Oxenstierna interpreted the imagery as a journey to Valhalla. He identified the building as Valhalla itself, the ship as sailing towards it, and the mounted rider accompanied by three animals as part of the same funerary imagery. The large quadruped beneath the ship has also been identified as possibly a wolf or a lion.

In 2000, Laila Kitzler Åhfeldt conducted a surface-structure analysis using laser scanning. Her results suggested that two carvers worked together on the original runic inscription, generally dated to around AD 800, and that the imagery could be linked to one of these carvers. The later inscription, dated to the 11th century, was attributed to a third carver.

In 2009, Ingemar Nordgren proposed that the imagery commemorates Theodoric the Great, king of the Ostrogoths from 471 to 526 AD. He identified the building as a representation of Theodoric's mausoleum. Nordgren suggested that the birds might be peacocks and interpreted the mounted figure as hunting a stag with a leopard. He also associated the crescent-shaped ship, an owl-like creature with a lion-like face, and a goose confronting a snake with Arian Christian iconography. Nordgren further proposed that the images date to the seventh century or earlier, predating even the original runic inscription, which he considered unrelated to the imagery.

== Inscription ==
a⁑iuls kaf ⁓ airikis sunʀ kaf alrik- -
Æivisl gaf, {} Æiriks sunʀ, gaf Alrik[ʀ] ...
Eyvísl(?), Eiríkr's son gave, Alríkr gave...

---t---la kaf rau- at kialt(i) · …a sa- faþiʀ ubsal faþiʀ suaþ a-a-u--ba …-ąmas nątu auk takaʀ ⁓ aslriku lu--ʀ ukþ-t a(i)u(i)sl
... gaf <rau-> at gialdi {} [Þ]a(?) sa[t] faðiʀ Upsal(?), faðiʀ svað ... ... nætʀ ok dagaʀ. {} Alrikʀ <lu--ʀ> ugð[i]t(?) Æivisl
... gave ... as payment. Then(?) the father sat(?) (in) Uppsala(?), the father that ... ... nights and days. Alríkr <lu--r> feared(?) not Eyvísl(?).

…s---n(u)(ʀ)-a-- þat sikmar aiti makuʀ airikis makin(i)aru þuną · aft aiuis uk raþ runąʀ þaʀ raki-ukutu iu þar suaþ aliriku lu(b)u faþi
... þat Sigmarr hæiti maguʀ Æiriks. Mæginiaru(?) <þuno> {} aft Æivisl. Ok rað runaʀ þaʀ rægi[n]kundu <iu> þar, svað Alrikʀ <lubu> faði.
... that Eiríkr's boy is called Sigmarr/celebrated-for-victories. Mighty battle(?) ... in memory of Eyvísl(?). And interpret the runes of divine origin there... , that Alríkr <lubu> coloured.

ui(u)-am …--ukrþsar(s)k(s)nuibin- ---kunʀ(u)k(l)ius-- …iu
<uiu-am> ... ... ...
... ... ...

: kisli : karþi : iftiʀ : kunar : bruþur [:] kubl : þisi
{} Gisli {} gærði {} æftiʀ {} Gunnar, {} broður, {} kumbl {} þessi.
Gísli made this monument in memory of Gunnarr, (his) brother.

== Photographs ==
The four sides of the Sparlösa Runestone

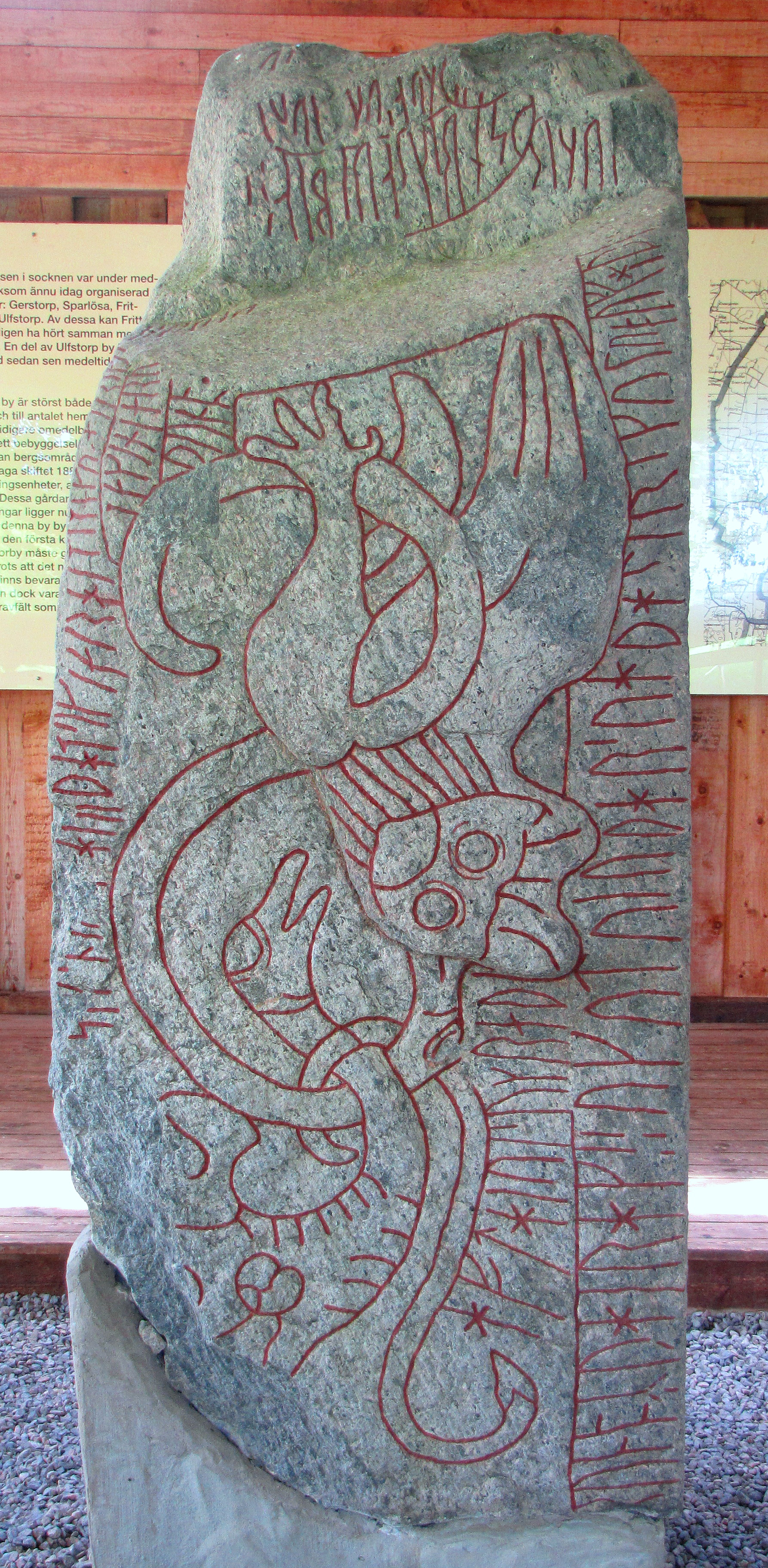
North side with inscription parts C and D.

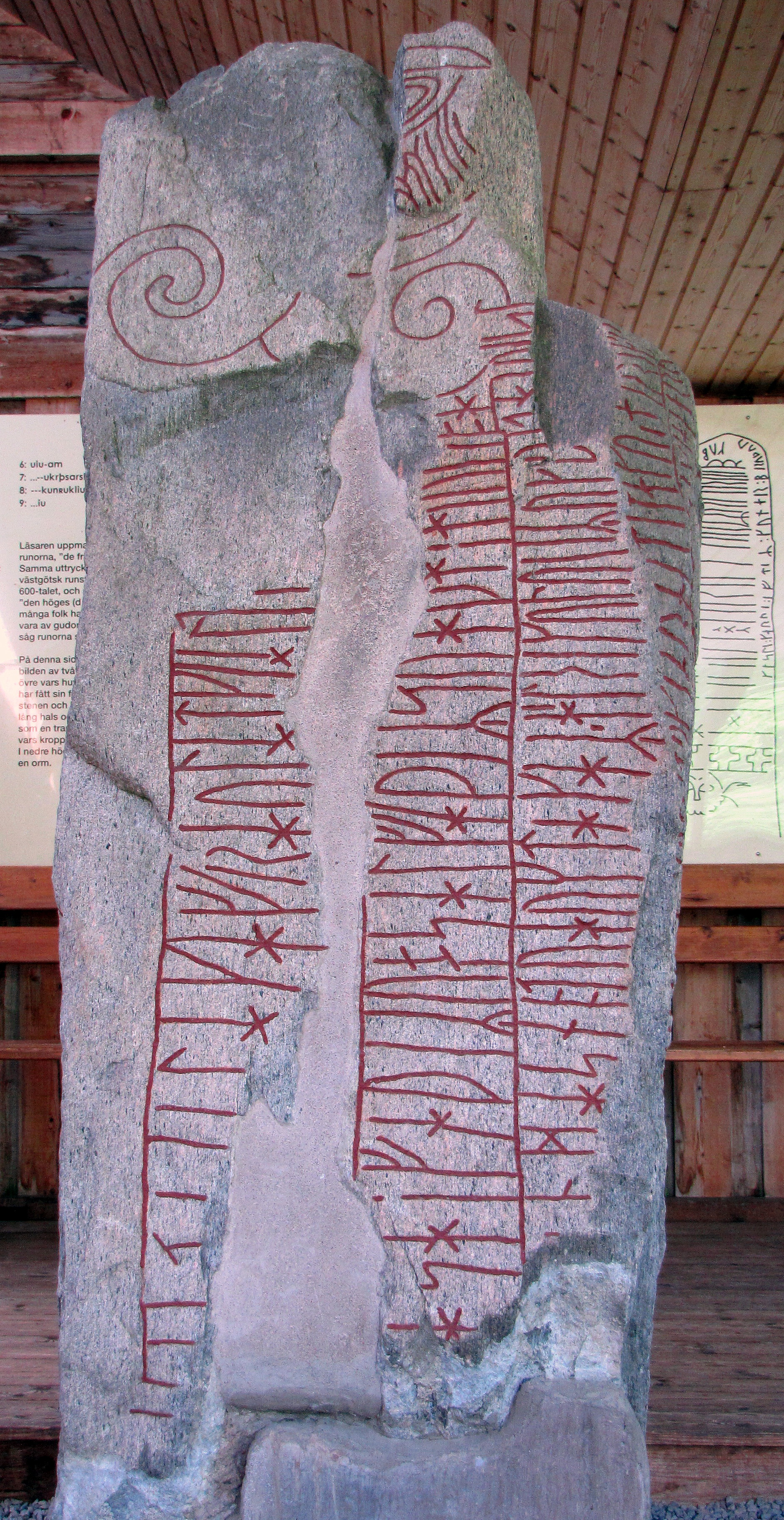
East side with part B.

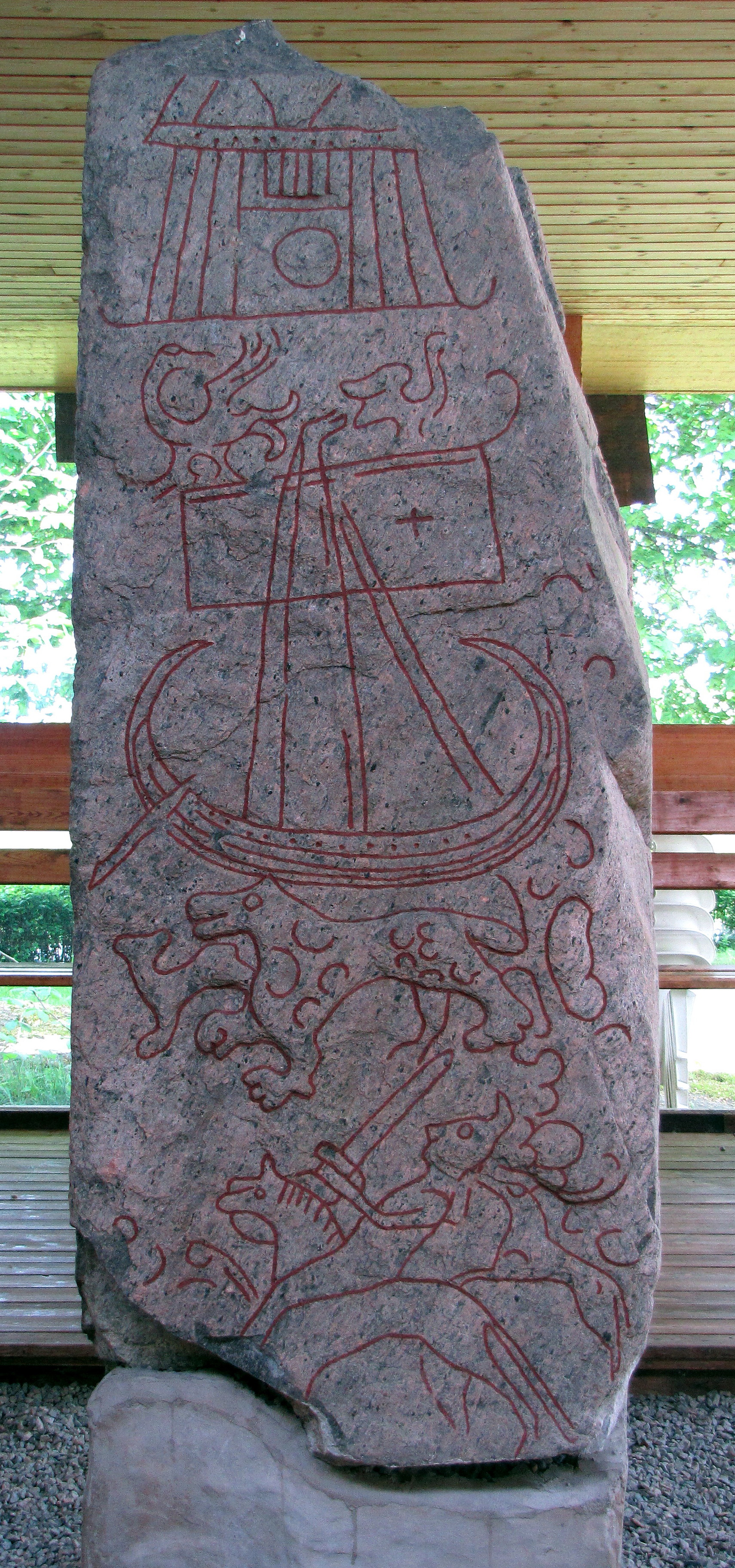
South side.

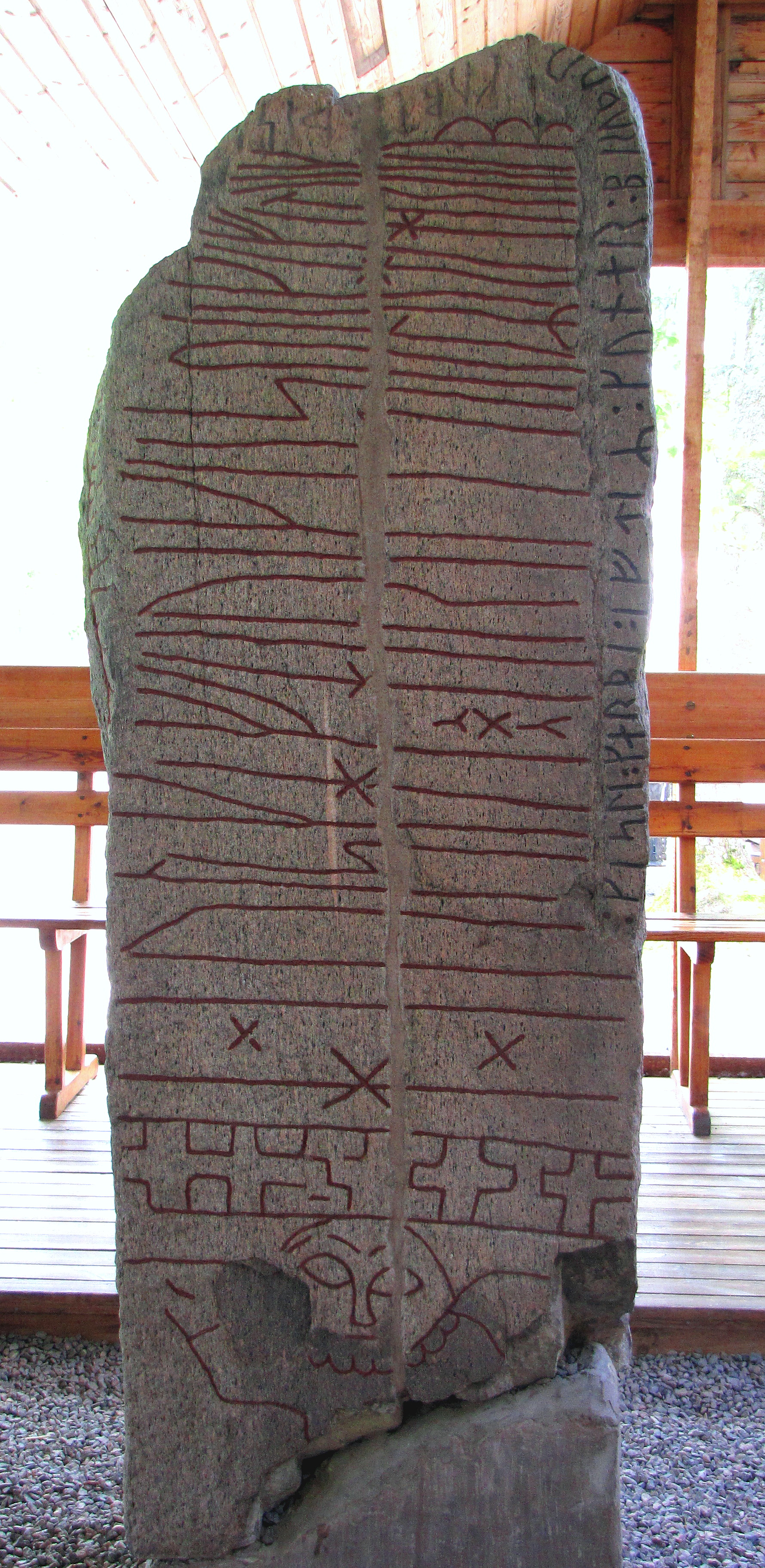
West side with parts A and E.
