= Świętosława =

Queen consort of Denmark

Daughter of Mieszko I
- Queen consort of Sweden (disputed); Queen consort of Denmark
- Born: 978/981
- Died: after 1017
- Spouses: Eric the Victorious (disputed); Swein Forkbeard
- Issue: Olof Skötkonung (disputed); Cnut the Great; Harald II of Denmark; "Santslaue"
- Dynasty: Piast
- Father: Mieszko I of Poland
- Mother: Most likely Oda of Haldensleben

"Świętosława" is a name that was used in the past by historians to refer to a Polish princess who was the daughter of Mieszko I of Poland, sister to Bolesław I of Poland, and purported wife of two Scandinavian kings. Modern research suggests it was likely not her name, and that she was only a wife to one of the aforementioned kings, Swein Forkbeard.

Some chroniclers recount that a princess, whose name is not given, was married first to Eric the Victorious of Sweden and then to Swein Forkbeard of Denmark, giving the former a son, Olof, and the latter two sons, Harald and Cnut. Because a documented sister of Cnut seems to have borne the Polish name Świętosława, it has been speculated that this may also have been the name of their mother, making her the Polish princess of the chroniclers.

The Icelandic sagas identify the queen of these two monarchs in turn as Sigrid the Haughty, daughter of Skagul Toste. This account is considered less reliable than the contemporary chroniclers by a number of scholars, according to Birgitta Fritz in Svenskt biografiskt lexikon, and the historical authenticity of Sigrid is viewed skeptically. Snorre Sturlasson also mentions a Slavic princess he calls Gunhild of Wenden, daughter of king Burislav of the Wends, the ancient Slavs inhabiting the northern regions of modern Poland, and it has been suggested that Gunhild may be a somewhat confused account of the sister of the Polish king Bolesław I described by the chroniclers.

Polish genealogist Rafał Prinke sees the German chroniclers as having combined the roles of two distinct wives of Swein Forkbeard, with the Polish princess actually being Gunhild, mother of Cnut, Harold and a daughter Świętosława. He sees Sigrid the Haughty as an authentic subsequent wife of Sweyn as widow of Eric the Victorious, being mother of Eric's son, Olaf, and of Sweyn's daughter, Estrid. He further suggests, although Świętosława was not the name of Sweyn's Polish wife, that the name had a history in the family and was perhaps the name of the otherwise unknown wife of Mieszko's father, Siemomysł.

== Contemporary sources ==
There is scant material in medieval chronicles to provide details regarding the marriages of Sweyn of Denmark and Eric of Sweden:

- Thietmar of Merseburg mentions that the daughter of Mieszko I of Poland and sister of Bolesław I Chrobry of Poland married Swein Forkbeard and gave him two sons, Cnut the Great and Harald II of Denmark, but he does not mention her name. Thietmar is probably the best informed of the medieval chroniclers addressing the question, since he was contemporary with the events described and well-informed about the events in Poland and Denmark. The assertion that Harald's and Cnut's mother was Bolesław's sister may explain some mysterious statements which appear in medieval chronicles, such as the involvement of Polish troops in invasions of England.
- Adam of Bremen writes almost a century later that a Polish princess—the sister or daughter of Bolesław I Chrobry of Poland—was the wife of Eric the Victorious and by this marriage the mother of Olof Skötkonung of Sweden, before she became mother of Cnut the Great and Harald II of Denmark in her second marriage with Sweyn. Adam's claims about the marriage to Eric are considered unreliable by many historians, since he is the only source to state this relationship and because he is writing several generations later. The scholia of Gesta Hammaburgensis Ecclesiae Pontificum mentions that it was the Polish king Bolesław who gave the princess' hand in marriage. One problem is that Olof was born at latest in the early 980's, before Boleslaw Chrobry came to power, and therefore was too old to be the unnamed princess's son.
- Gesta Cnutonis regis mentions in one short passage that Cnut and his brother went to the land of the Slavs, and brought back their mother, who was living there. This does not necessarily mean that his mother was Slavic, but nevertheless this chronicle strongly suggests that she was.
- The "Liber vitae of the New Minster and Hyde Abbey Winchester" has an entry for a sister of king Cnut named "Santslaue" (Santslaue soror CNVTI regis nostri), which is seen as a Slavic name. Based on this single mention of what would be her daughter and the supposition that the name in question represents the Old Polish name Świętosława found in a later generation of the Polish royal family, J. Steenstrup suggested that this child was named for her mother and hence the Polish wife of Eric and Sweyn was likewise named Świętosława, the name now generally used for her.

== Bibliography ==
- Oswald Balzer, Genealogia Piastów, Kraków 1895.
- Włodzimierz Dworzaczek, Genealogia, Warsaw 1959
- Andrzej Feliks Grabski, Bolesław Chrobry. Zarys dziejów politycznych i wojskowych, Warsaw 1964.
- Kazimierz Jasiński, Rodowód pierwszych Piastów, Warsaw-Wrocław (1992).
- Rafał T. Prinke, Świętosława, Sygryda, Gunhilda. Tożsamośc córki Mieszka I i jej skandynawskie związki in Roczniki Historyczne LXX (2004), Poznań – Warszawa 2004
