= Edmund of Sweden =

Edmund of Sweden - Swedish: Emund - may refer to:

- Emund Eriksson, Swedish prince or king 10th century
- Emund the Old, Swedish king c. 1050–1060
- Emund Eriksson the Younger, Swedish prince 10th century, son of King Eric the Victorious
- Anund Jacob of Sweden, in some sources nicknamed Emund
- Prince Gustaf Adolf, Duke of Västerbotten, who was called only Edmund in private
