= Ulf Tostesson =

Ulf Tostesson was a jarl and the son of the Viking Skogul Toste. He was the brother of Sigrid the Haughty, and his son was Ragnvald Ulfsson.
