= Uppland Runic Inscription 328 =

Coordinates: 59.5878°N 18.0359°E

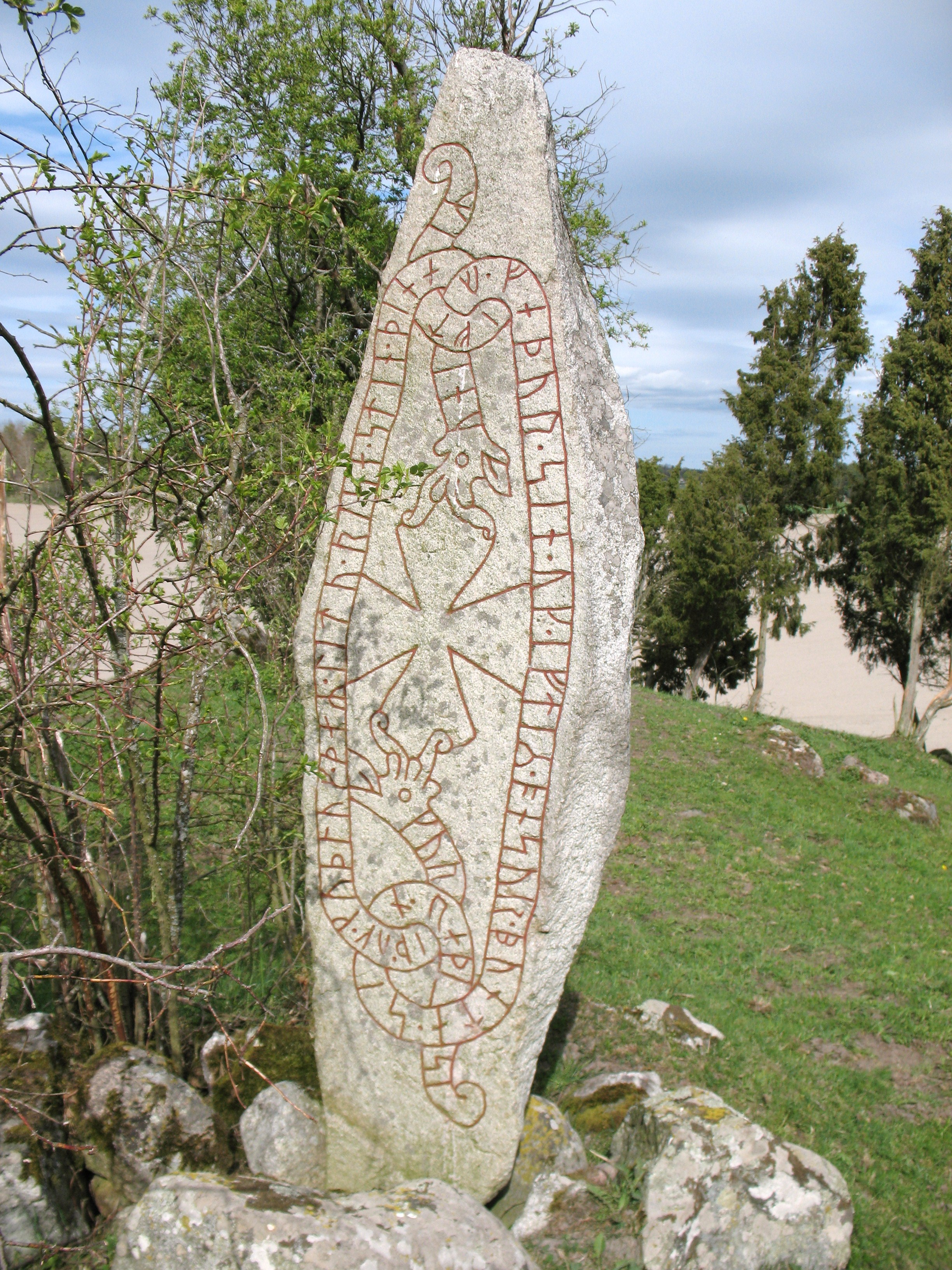
- Created: 11th Century
- Discovered: Stora Lundby, Uppland, Sweden
- Rundata ID: U 328
- Runemaster: Ulf of Borresta

Text – Native
- Old Norse : See article.

Translation
- See article.

The Uppland Runic Inscription 328 stands on a hill in a paddock at the farm Stora Lundby, which is about four kilometers west of Lindholmen, Stockholm County, Sweden, in the historic province of Uppland. The runestone is one of several runestones that have permitted scholars to trace family relations among some powerful Viking clans in Sweden during the 11th century.

== Description ==
The inscription consists of runic text on two intertwined serpents that form an oval around a Christian cross. The runestone is an example of the Ringerike style, and it is categorized as being carved in runestone style Pr1. The runestone was raised by two women named Gyrið and Guðlaug in memory of the master of the homestead whose name was Andsvarr and in memory of their father whose name was engraved as unif. These runes are interpreted as Ónæm, the accusative case of Ónæmr, a name which means "Slow Learner." A man having this rare name, Ónæmr, is also mentioned on two nearby runestones, U 112 in Kyrkstigen and U 336 in Orkesta, and so the three runestones are held to refer to the same person.

The other runestones tell of the family of the two women, their father and the runemaster who made it. The runemaster Ulf of Borresta declared on U 336 that he was Ónæmr's paternal nephew, and consequently he was Gyrið and Guðlaug's first cousin. Ulf is notable in himself since the runestone U 344 in Yttergärde declares that Ulf had taken three danegelds in England. The first one was with Skagul Toste in 991, the second one with Thorkel the High in 1012 and the last one with Canute the Great in 1018.

The runestone U 112 in Kyrkstigen informs that a maternal nephew of Ónæmr was Ragnvaldr who was the commander of the Varangian Guard in Constantinople. Ragnvaldr had the runestone U 112 made in memory of himself and his mother, Ónæmr's daughter.

Ónæmr's daughter Guðlaug appears to have had the son Holmi who fell in Italy which is mentioned on the runestone U 133 in Täby. It is likely that Holmi fell in battle as a member of the Varangian Guard in southern Italy.

Andsvarr (an allomorph of Özurr and Assur), in memory of whom the runestone also was raised, may be the same man as the housecarl who is mentioned on the runestone U 330 in Snottsta. Gyríðr is also mentioned on U 100 in Skälby and U 226 in Bällsta.

The runic text ends with the imperative Rað þessi! which is translated as "Interpret these!" Other runestones with similar imperative exclamations in their runic texts include U 29 in Hillersjö and Sö 158 in Österberga. The runes for this phrase, raþisi, are carved on the serpent's tail and follow the rule that double consonants are represented with only a single consonant, even if one of the two consonants are at the end of one word and the second is at the beginning of the next word. The transliteration of the runic text for this phrase, raþ| |þisi, shows a separate þ-rune for each of the two words.

== Inscription ==
=== Latin transliteration ===
kuriþ * uk * kuþluk * þaʀ * litu * risa * stin * þina iftiʀ unif * faþur * sin * uk * iftiʀ * onsur * bunta * sin * raþ| |þisi

=== Old Norse transcription ===
Gyrið ok Guðlaug þaʀ letu ræisa stæin þenna æftiʀ Onæm(?), faður sinn, ok æftiʀ Ansur, bonda sinn. Rað þessi!

=== English translation ===
Gyríðr and Guðlaug, they had this stone raised in memory of Ónæmr(?), their father and in memory of Andsvarr, their husbandman. Interpret these!

== See also ==
- List of runestones
