= Eric IV =

Eric IV may refer to:

- Eric (IV) of Sweden
- Eric IV of Denmark (c. 1216–1250)
- Eric IV, Duke of Saxe-Lauenburg (1354–1411/1412)
