= Aud Haakonsdottir of Lade =

Legendary Viking age queen consort

Aud Haakonsdottir of Lade, also called Öda Haakonsdottir of Lade (10th century), was a legendary Swedish Viking Age queen consort, according to the sagas the last spouse of King Eric the Victorious of Sweden.

== Life ==
Aud was allegedly a daughter of Norwegian Jarl Haakon Sigurdsson of Lade and sister of regent Eiríkr Hákonarson. It is not known exactly if or when she married King Eric, nor when she was born and died, but she is guessed to have married him after his marriage to the famous Sigrid Storråda. The marriage has never been confirmed, and it is also suggested, that if she did exist, she may have been his mistress, or a brief marriage late in his life.

== References and literature ==
- Åke Ohlmarks: Alla Sveriges drottningar (All the queens of Sweden) (Swedish)
- Lars O. Lagerqvist (1982) (in Swedish). "Sverige och dess regenter under 1.000 år",("Sweden and its rulers during 1000 years").. Albert Bonniers Förlag AB. ISBN 91-0-075007-7.
