= Ulf of Borresta =

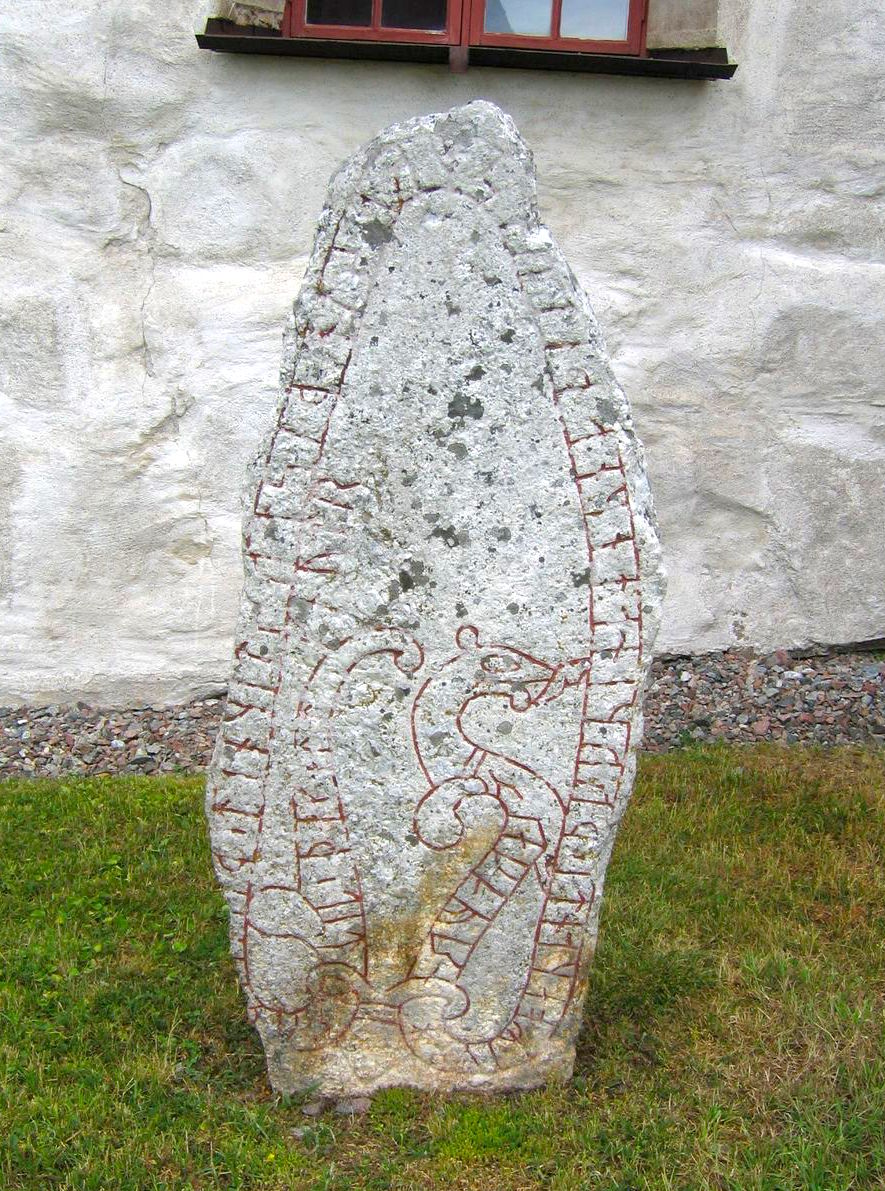
U 344.

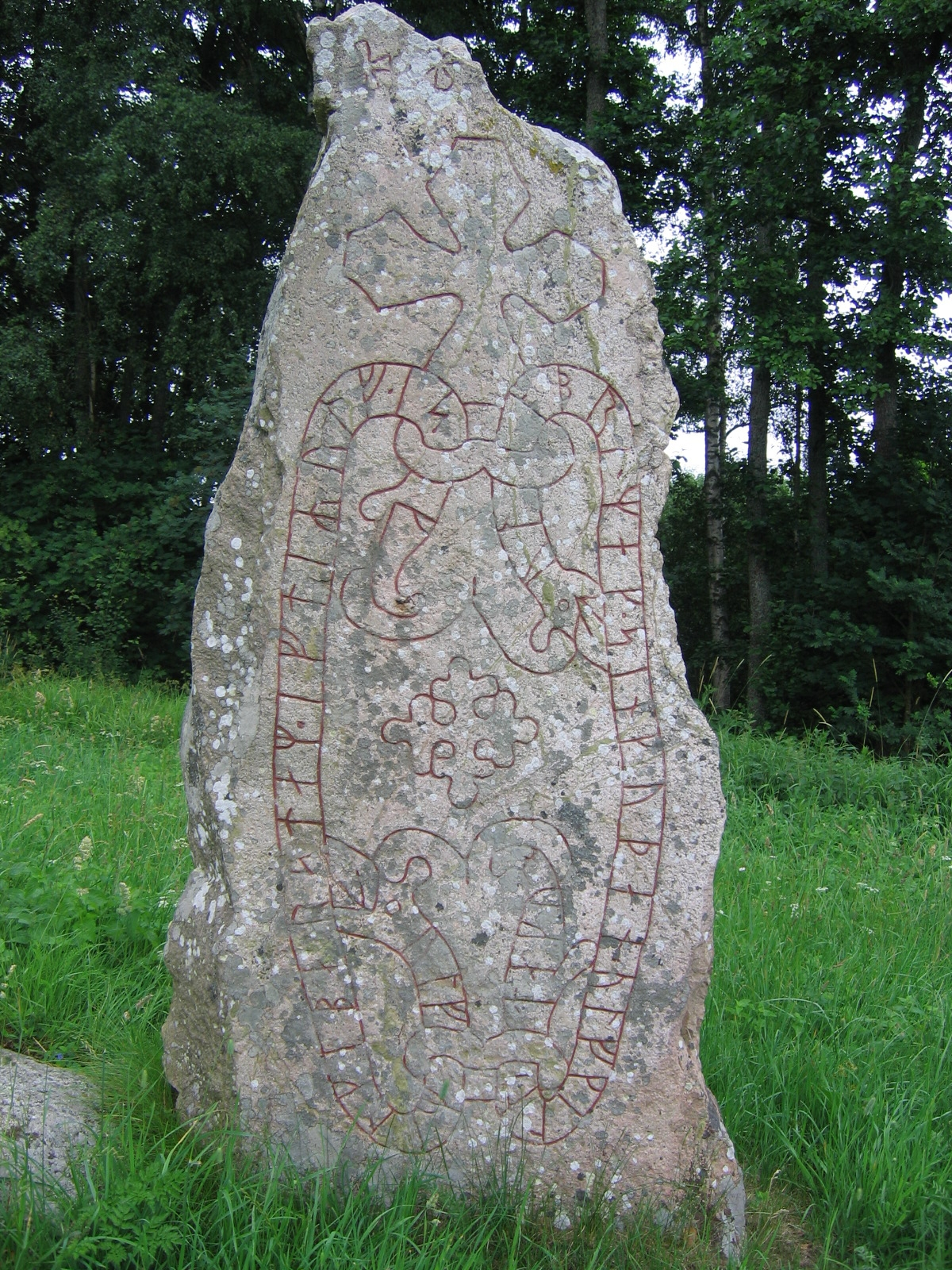
U 161.

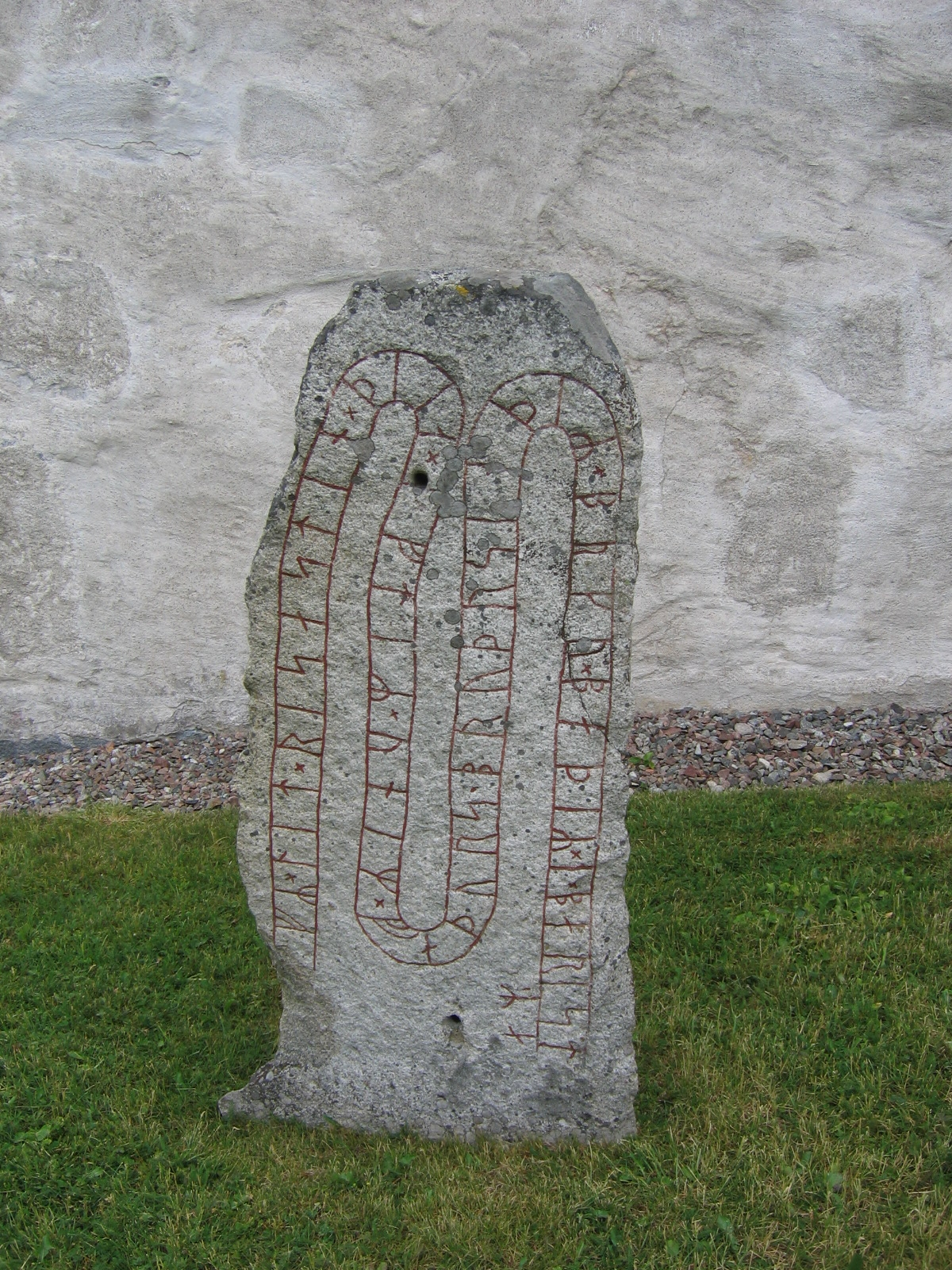
U 336.

Ulf of Borresta (Old Norse: Ulfr í Báristǫðum, modern Swedish: Ulf i Borresta) was a runemaster in the eleventh century Uppland, Sweden, and a successful Viking who returned from England three times with a share of the Danegeld. He is named after his estate which in modern Swedish is called Borresta or Bårresta (Old Norse: Báristaðir or Bárastaðiʀ).

== Ulf's clan ==
Ulf belonged to a clan in what is today the parish of Orkesta, located in present-day Vallentuna Municipality, and he was the paternal nephew and successor of a man named Ónæmr, a name which means "slow learner". Ónæmr is mentioned on several runestones, U 112, U 336 and probably U 328 (which is an example of the Ringerike style.). The name of Guðlaug's father on U 328 is interpreted as Ónæmr, and Guðlaug had a son named Holmi who fell in Italy which is mentioned on the runestone U 133. Another cousin of Ulf named Ragnvaldr was the commander of the Varangian Guard in Constantinople and made the runestone U 112 in memory of himself and his mother, Ónæmr's daughter.

== Runestones made by Ulf ==
Ulf made the runestone U 328 and also the runestone U 336 in memory of his uncle Ónæmr which today is raised at the church of Orkesta. He also made the runestones U 160 and 161 for his kinsmen-by-marriage in Skålhammar (Old Norse: Skulhamarr).

== Runestones in Ulf's memory ==
There were two runestones (runestone U 344 and runestone U 343) which were raised in Ulf's memory and they were raised together as a monument at Yttergärde. U 343 has disappeared but U 344 is now raised at the church of Orkesta.

The runestone U 344, in the style Pr3, was found in 1868, at Yttergärde, by Richard Dybeck. It can be dated to the first half of the 11th century because of its use of the ansuz rune for the a and æ phomenes, and because of its lack of dotted runes.

This stone is notable because it commemorates that Ulf had taken three danegelds in England. The first one was with Skagul Toste in 991, the second one with Thorkel the High in 1012 and the last one with Canute the Great in 1018. Since there were many years between the danegelds, it is likely that Ulfr returned to Sweden after each danegeld to live as a wealthy magnate. It is a remarkable feat in itself to summarize Ulf's adventurous life in so few unsentimental words.

The runestone U 343 reports Ulf's death and it was raised in his memory by his sons Karsi and Karlbjörn.

== Other sources ==
- Enoksen, Lars Magnar. (1998). Runor : historia, tydning, tolkning. Historiska Media, Falun. ISBN 91-88930-32-7
- Jansson, Sven B. (1980). Runstenar. STF, Stockholm. ISBN 91-7156-015-7
- Pritsak, Omeljan. (1981). The origin of Rus'. Cambridge, Mass.: Distributed by Harvard University Press for the Harvard Ukrainian Research Institute. ISBN 0-674-64465-4
