= Eric VI =

Eric VI may refer to:

- Eric VI of Denmark
- Eric VI of Sweden
