= Erik Ringsson =

King of Sweden
- Successor: Emund Eriksson
- Father: Ring
- Religion: Pagan

Erik Ringsson (Note: Referring to Erik Ringsson as King Eric IV or V is later inventions, counting backwards from Eric XIV (1560–68). He and his brother Charles IX (1604–1611) adopted numerals according to a fictitious history of Sweden. The number of Swedish monarchs named Eric before Eric XIV (at least seven) is unknown, going back into prehistory, and none of them used numerals. It would be speculative to try to affix a mathematically accurate one to this king.) was a Swedish king and the son of Ring, according to the German ecclesiastic chronicler Adam of Bremen. He is said to have ruled together with his father and his brother Emund in about 936, and later presumably reigned in his own name.

== Reign ==
The name of this king is only known from Adam's work Gesta Hammaburgensis ecclesiae pontificum from c. 1075. The Archbishop of Hamburg-Bremen, Unni, was able to arrange church matters in Denmark after the defeat of the Danes at the hands of King Henry the Fowler of Germany in 934. From Denmark he proceeded to the Swedish trading port Birka in 935 or 936. Referring to information from the Danish King Sweyn Estridsen, Adam states that the Swedes at this time were ruled by a certain Ring and his sons Erik and Emund. Adam finds it likely that Unni approached these heathen kings and obtained permission to propagate Christianity, which by this time was long forgotten in the region. After his mission was over, Unni prepared to return but fell ill and died in Birka in 936. Later on Adam mentions an Emund Eriksson as ruling in Sweden at the height of Harald Bluetooth's reign in Denmark (around the 970s). From his name he appears to have been a son of Erik Ringsson.

== Dating of reign ==
The reign of Erik Ringsson has been tentatively dated in the 940s and 950s. He is not mentioned in any Norse sagas or king lists. 13th century sagas, such as Hervarar saga ok Heiðreks and Heimskringla, mention a Björn Eriksson as ruling for a long time in the 10th century, being the father of the historical ruler Eric the Victorious (c. 980–995).

== See also ==
- Early Swedish History

== Notes ==
Erik Ringsson House of Munsö
Regnal titles
Preceded by Ring	Semi-legendary king of Sweden	Succeeded by Emund Eriksson
