= Gunhild of Wenden =

Wendish princess, daughter of Burislav, King of the Wends

Gunhilda of Wenden (also known as Gunhild of Wendland) is a semi-legendary or disputed figure described in medieval sources as a Wendish noblewoman and Danish Viking Age queen consort, the supposed spouse of 10th-century King Sweyn Forkbeard (c. 960 – 1014).

The sources regarding Sweyn's wife or wives are highly contradictory. Norse sagas (such as those in Snorri Sturluson's Heimskringla) refer to a Gunhild as daughter of "Burislav, King of the Wends" (likely referring to the Obotrites or other West Slavic tribes in the southern Baltic coast, modern northern Germany/Poland border region), while contemporary or near-contemporary German chroniclers like Thietmar of Merseburg mention an unnamed daughter of Mieszko I of Poland (sister of Bolesław I the Brave) who married Sweyn and bore him sons Cnut the Great and Harald II. Historians have long debated whether Gunhilda represents the same person as the reconstructed Świętosława, drawing towards a possible identification with Sigrid the Haughty, or a composite literary figure.

Primarily on interpretations of Thietmar and Adam of Bremen, the Wendish/Obotrite connection in the sagas points to a West Slavic noble background from the pagan Wendish territories rather than the emerging Piast core. This identification remains a tentative hypothesis with significant saga-chronicle contradictions regarding names, parentage, and timelines. Mainstream Scandinavian scholarship often views her as semi-legendary or an amalgamation of diplomatic marriage alliances common in the Baltic region.

No strong archaeological or genetic evidence supports a singular historical queen matching all attributes, and some scholars consider Gunhilda a literary construct used to dramatize dynastic networks.

== Heimskringla ==
In the 13th century collection of sagas, Heimskringla, Snorri Sturluson tells that Sweyn Forkbeard was captured in an attack on the Jomsvikings, and turned over to Burislav, king of Wenden. As part of their negotiations, it was agreed that Sweyn would marry Gunhild, the daughter of Burislav, while the latter would marry Sweyn's sister Tyri. By Gunhild, Sweyn is said to have had Harald II of Denmark and Cnut the Great. While this account agrees with certain aspects of the historical record, there are also differences.

== Chroniclers ==
There is exiguous material in medieval chronicles to provide details regarding the marriages of Sweyn of Denmark and Erik of Sweden:

- Thietmar of Merseburg mentions that the daughter of the Mieszko I of Poland and sister of Bolesław I Chrobry of Poland married Sweyn Forkbeard and gave him two sons, Cnut the Great and Harald II of Denmark, but he does not mention her name anywhere in this chronicle. Thietmar is probably the best informed of the medieval chroniclers addressing the question, since he was contemporary with the events described and well-informed about the events in Poland and Denmark. The assertion that Harald's and Canute's mother was Boleslaw's sister may explain some extremely mysterious statements which appear in medieval chronicles, such as the involvement of Polish troops in invasions of England, a very speculative and highly contested myth in itself according to the mainstream scholarly consensus.
- Adam of Bremen writes almost a century later that a Polish princess—the sister or daughter of Bolesław I Chrobry of Poland—was the wife of Eric the Victorious and by this marriage the mother of Olof Skötkonung of Sweden, before she became mother of Cnut the Great and Harald II of Denmark in her second marriage with Sweyn. Adam's claims about the marriage to Eric are considered unreliable by most historians, since he is the only source to state this relationship and because he is writing several generations later. The scholia of Gesta Hammaburgensis ecclesiae pontificum mentions that it was the Polish king Boleslaw who gave the princess's hand in marriage. One problem is that Olof was born at latest in the early 980s, before Boleslaw Chrobry came to power, and therefore was too old to be the unnamed princess's son.
- Gesta Cnutonis regis mentions in one short passage that Cnut and his brother went to the land of the Wends, and brought back their mother, who was living there. This does not necessarily mean that his mother was Wendish, but nevertheless this chronicle may suggest that she was. While this has been interpreted by some as evidence of Wendish maternal origin, the text does not explicitly confirm her ethnicity or birthplace, and could refer to political exile, diplomatic circumstances, or other factors common in Viking Age Baltic networks.
- An inscription in the Liber Vitae of the New Minster and Hyde Abbey, Winchester, records the name of Cnut's sister as "Santslaue" (Santslaue soror CNVTI regis nostri), a clearly Wendish name. Danish historian J. Steenstrup proposed that Cnut's mother may have borne a similar Wendish name, leading to the speculative modern revisionist reconstruction Świętosława. However, this remains a tentative hypothesis based on a single mention of the sister's name and the assumption that the mother and daughter shared the same name—a common but unproven practice. Mainstream scholarship regards it as speculative rather than conclusive.

Overall, these details add to the contradictory and fragmentary picture of Cnut's maternal ancestry. Norse sagas emphasize a Wendish/Obotrite connection (Gunhild daughter of Burislav), while Continental sources suggest a more stretched, albeit unlikely, Piast connection, or broader West Slavic ties. Historians continue to debate whether these point to one woman, two, or a composite semi-legendary literary figure shaped by dynastic propaganda.

== Identities ==
Several alternative interpretations of these data have been proposed; many are contradictory or conflating several figures. Gunhild might be identical to the historical wife of Sweyn. Further, the dual marriage reported by Adam of Bremen matches the Heimskringla account of Sigrid the Haughty. This may represent confusion between two wives, or it could just be that Sigrid is a confused duplicate memory of the alleged same historical wife. This would mean that the woman called Gunhild in the sagas may have been Eric's widow, as few contemporary historians have hypothesized. Finally, Gunhild might be simply a legendary invention, not directly based on Sweyn's known Wendish wife.
