= Harald II of Denmark =

King of Denmark from 1014 to c. 1018

Harald II
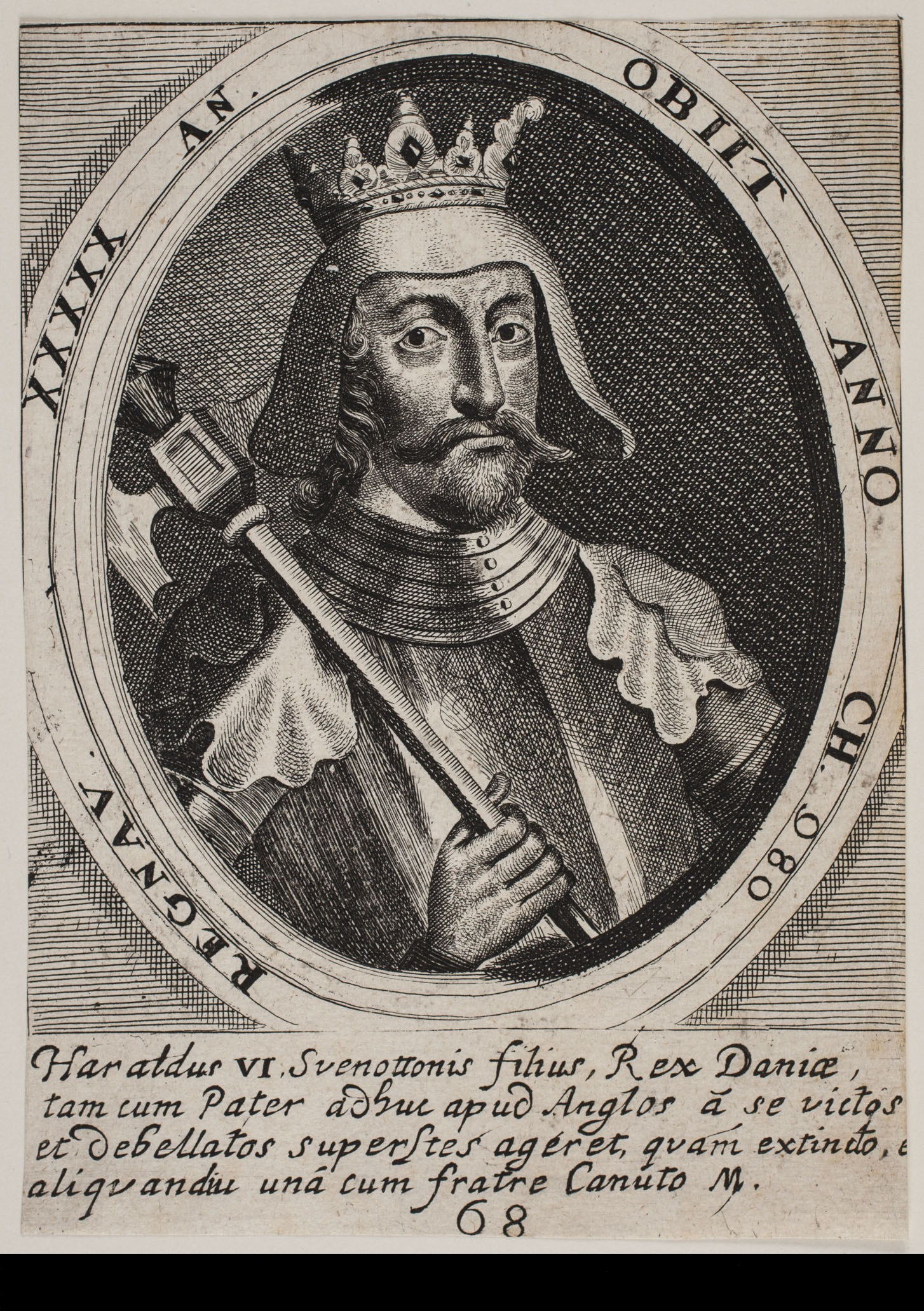
- Harald II as depicted in a copper engraving from 1646 by Albert Haelwegh

King of Denmark
- Reign: 3 February 1014 – c. 1018
- Predecessor: Sweyn Forkbeard
- Successor: Canute II

King (Overlord) of Norway
- Reign: 1014-1015
- Predecessor: Sveyn Forkbeard
- Successor: Olaf Haraldsson
- Regent: Sweyn Haakonsson Haakon Ericsson
- Born: c. 996–998
- Died: c. 1018
- House: Jelling
- Father: Sweyn Forkbeard
- Mother: Gunhild (detail)
- Religion: Chalcedonian Christianity

Harald Svendsen (c. 996–998 − c. 1018) was King of Denmark (being Harald II or Harald IV) from 1014 until his death in c. 1018. He was the youngest son of Sweyn Forkbeard and Gunhild of Wenden, and was regent while his father was fighting Æthelred the Unready in England. After his father's death, he was elected to the Danish throne in 1014, while his brother, the later king Cnut the Great was elected to the throne of England. After his death in 1018(?), he was succeeded by Cnut the Great. Little detail is known about Harald II.

== Family and early life ==
Harald was the youngest son of the King of Denmark Swein Forkbeard and his wife Gunhild of Wenden.
Other than his brother Cnut, Harald also had a number of siblings, most of them half sisters, as Harald and Cnut's father, Swein Forkbeard, had children with many different women. The most famous of his sisters was Estrid. When their father Sveyn died, Cnut became Estrid's guardian, and it appears Cnut had married her off to a Russian Prince (possibly Vsevolod Vladimirovich) who died in 1015, who was the son of Vladimir of Rus. Incidentally, all monarchs of Denmark from the House of Knýtlinga after 1047 descend from Estrid (through her later marriage to Ulf Jarl, who lived the longest of all Harald's siblings.) No sources mention Harald being married.

We do not know Harald's birth year (and his birthplace), nor do we know his age when he died. Because of this, several estimates have been proposed over time regarding when Harald might have been born, with the most common estimates ranging from around the year 989 to around 998. However, we know more about his brother, Cnut, who died in 1035. Based on this, Cnut must have been born circa 995 to 996. Since Harald was younger than Cnut, this narrows Harald's possible birth year down to around ca. 996 –998.
There is no surviving information about his upbringing.

== Nomenclature ==
Although Harald was the youngest of Swein's sons, it was he, rather than his brother Cnut, who was named after their paternal grandfather, Harald Bluetooth. According to some sources, Bluetooth may in turn have been named after his own maternal grandfather. If that is true, the name was used regularly within the family from the 9th to the 11th centuries, as well as in the 12th century.S. Otto Brenner: Nachkommen Gorms des Alten (König von Dänemark -936-) I.-XVI. Generation, Stuttgart, 1965. (s. 335)

Harald's designation as "the Second" in the Danish line of succession reflects his traditional position as the second monarch named Harald since the reign of his great-great-grandfather, Harthacnut, the father of Gorm the Old. The traditional numbering of Danish monarchs begins with Harthacnut—a convention followed by most historiographists since the late 19th century—even though the names of several reasonably well-attested Danish kings are known from up to 200 years prior. Among these prehistorically recorded kings are a man named Harald who likely ruled in the 8th century and a man named Harald Klak, who ruled on several occasions during the 9th century. Counting these earlier rulers makes Harald II the fourth historically known Danish king of that name. Subsequent Haralds on the Danish throne were Harald II's grandnephew, Harald Hén, the King of Denmark from 1076 to 1080, and Harald Hén's nephew, Harald Kesja the regent from 1103 to 1104, and the anti-king of Denmark in Jutland 1134–1135. Following the 1180s, the name fell out of use in the royal family until it was revived in 1876 with the birth of Prince Harald.

== Regent ==
The first reliable information we have about Swein Forkbeard's son, Harald is that when Swein Forkbeard called out the leidang in 1013 and sailed across the North Sea to conquer England, he made his son Harald regent in his absence. However, he left behind a number of trusted magnates to serve as protectors and advisors to Harald.

== King of Denmark ==
A sizable fleet had to be assembled before Cnut and his followers were ready to invade England in 1015.

A romanticized 19th-century depiction of a Viking fleet in London painted by Everhardus Koster.

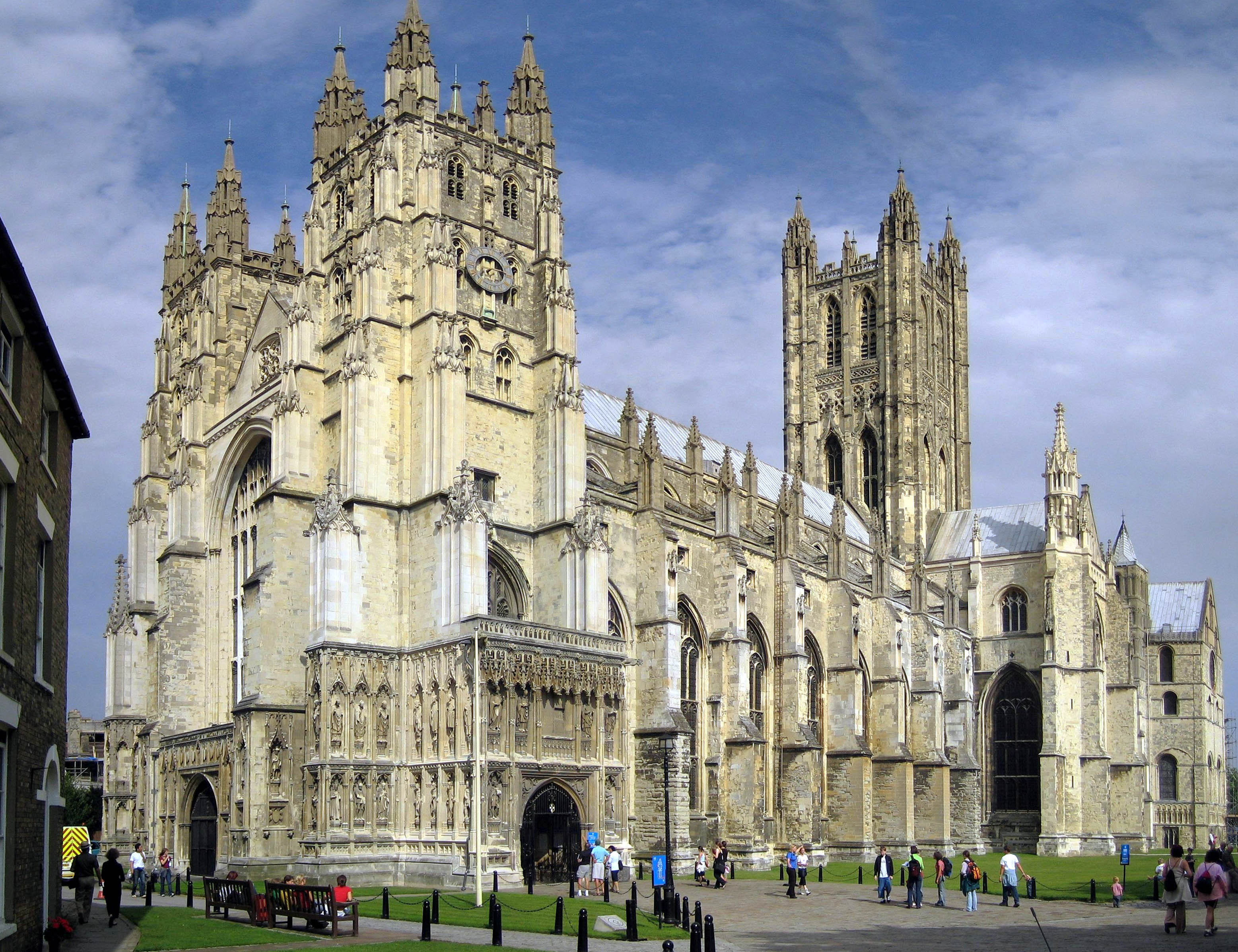
Canterbury Cathedral as it stands roughly 1,000 years after Harald's reign.

Upon the death of Swein Forkbeard in February 1014, after ruling England for barely forty days, the Danish army in England acclaimed his son Cnut as king, whereas the magnates back in Denmark chose his younger brother Harald. Meanwhile, the Witenagemot recalled the exiled King Æthelred from Normandy and declared Cnut an outlaw, forcing Cnut to sail back to Denmark in 1014 to gather fresh support. Harald received his brother with fraternal warmth and royal honors. According to contemporary accounts, Cnut asked Harald to make Cnut the other King of Denmark, making Denmark a diarchy, a demand Harald flatly refused, however, he promised to supply Cnut with ships and men to help him reconquer England. In the Encomium Emmae Reginae, Harald's answer to his brother is recorded as follows:

I rejoice at your arrival, dear brother, and am grateful to you for having visited me; but it is hard for me to hear what you say regarding the division of the kingdom. The inheritance which our father gave over to me with your own approval, I govern; I am sorry that you have lost your inheritance, which was greater than this, and I am ready to give you help, but I will not agree to divide my kingdom.

Their father, Swein Forkbeard, had initially been buried in York. Fearing that the restored King Æthelred II would desecrate Swein's remains, an English noblewoman arranged for the body to be exhumed, embalmed with aromatic herbs, and shipped across the North Sea to Denmark. Harald and Cnut met the vessel at the coast and had their father laid to rest in the Trinity Monastery that Swein himself had founded and chosen as his burial place. (Note: This monastery was possibly located in Roskilde, though Lund and Hedeby have also been proposed by historians as the site of the monastery.)

Later in 1014, Harald and Cnut mounted a joint expedition across the Baltic Sea to Poland to bring home their mother, Gunhild, whom Swein Forkbeard had repudiated when he married Sigrid the Haughty. The brothers also used the campaign to achieve broader military and political aims: they raided Wendish strongholds along the southern Baltic coast—likely as a warning to Thorkell the Tall, whose power base lay in that region—and reinforced the Danish colony in Sambia against local rivals.

In the summer of 1015, the jarl and veteran commander Thorkell the Tall sailed to Denmark to reconcile with Cnut. Although chroniclers focus on the negotiations between Thorkell and Cnut, Thorkell could hardly have landed in Denmark and been entertained at royal feasts without Harald's explicit approval. Relations among the three men were delicate: without a formal settlement, Thorkell could not feel secure in his position as Jarl of Scania, while Harald could not be certain that Scania would remain loyal to the Danish crown. Above all, Cnut needed Thorkell's seasoned warriors if his upcoming invasion of England was to have any chance of success. By late summer 1015, the leidang levy and royal war fleet were assembled, and Cnut departed with Thorkell to reclaim his father's English realm.

One contemporary chronicler, Thietmar of Merseburg, reports that Harald personally joined the campaign in 1016, bringing reinforcements when Cnut besieged London against Æthelred II, who died during the siege. (Note: If Thietmar's account is accurate on this point, Harald was almost certainly also present in London when Cnut was first acclaimed as King of England.) Furthermore, in 1016 or 1017, both Cnut and Harald were entered together into the confraternity book of Christ Church at Canterbury Cathedral. Unless this entry was purely an honorary gesture arranged by Cnut on his brother's behalf, it reinforces the possibility that Harald actually spent time in England during the conquest.

=== Foreign relations ===
Throughout his reign, Harald's foreign policy centered almost entirely on England and the southern Baltic littoral. He faced no serious pressure from his southern neighbor, the Holy Roman Empire, largely because Emperor Henry II was preoccupied with conflicts elsewhere in Europe: Henry spent 1014 and much of 1015 dealing with political unrest in Italy, and from 1015 to 1018 he was tied down in the Third Polish-German War.

=== Administration and economy ===
Who governed Denmark as regent during Harald's absences abroad is unrecorded, though it was likely handled by the same circle of trusted magnates whom Swein Forkbeard had appointed to advise Harald in 1013–1014.

Ecclesiastically, the Danish church remained formally subordinate to the Archbishopric of Hamburg-Bremen even though Swein Forkbeard had increasingly favored ties with the Archbishop of Canterbury over the northern German see. (Note: Harald's formal enrollment in the confraternity at Canterbury Cathedral suggests that he maintained his father's close ecclesiastical links with Canterbury.) At least two bishops active in Denmark during Harald's reign are known by name: Bishop Ekkehard (or Esico of Oldenburg) in Schleswig and Bishop Odinkar the Younger in Ribe, who may have been a close kinsman of the king. Bishop Gotebald of Scania, originally appointed by Swein Forkbeard, may also have continued in office under Harald.

No surviving Danish coins can be attributed to Harald's brief reign. (Note: Substantial amounts of silver from Sweyn Forkbeard's English campaigns and Danegeld payments had already flowed into Denmark in the years leading up to Harald's accession, which may explain why minting new domestic coinage was not an immediate priority during his short rule.)

=== Overlord of Norway ===
Harald also held nominal authority over parts of Norway until 1015, when Olaf II Haraldsson returned from abroad and swiftly established control over most of the country. (Note: Between 1012 and 1015/16, the Earls of Lade, Sweyn Haakonsson and his nephew Haakon Ericsson, exercised actual power in Norway, though sources are ambiguous about whose formal suzerainty they acknowledged after 1014. While most historians consider Harald II the most likely king of Norway, the question cannot be settled with complete certainty.) (Note: If Harald harbored plans to reassert Danish authority over Norway, such an expedition would likely have waited until Cnut's campaign in England was concluded. Because of Harald's early death around 1018, nothing is known of his longer-term political ambitions.)

== Personal life and death ==
There is no information regarding any known children of Harald, though it cannot be entirely ruled out based solely on chroniclers not mentioning children, that he may have had some.

Harald's relationship with his brother Cnut, and Cnut's relationship with Harald appears to have been one of mutual respect. The only hitch we hear about is Cnut's request for a share in the rule of Denmark, yet even this request does not seem to have caused any kind of resentment.
Florence of Worcester recounts at one point in his chronicle how Cnut in 1017 asks an Englishman named Æthelweard to murder Eadwig Ætheling, and to emphasize his stance, the king says to Æthelweard "you shall be dearer to me than my own brother", provided he would carry out this task. Cnut was consistently a ruthless ruler, and there is nothing in his history to suggest that he held those "dear" whom he got to assassinate his rivals. However, his relationship with his family was another matter, and the sources indicate that Cnut actually loved and respected his family.

There is no information as to whether Harald's mother, Gunhild outlived her youngest son or not. The last time we hear of her in the sources is in the summer of 1015, when Cnut set off for England.

The year of Harald II's death is not known with certainty, but he died no later than 1018. (Note: Harald's death may have been proclaimed at the landsting in Viborg.) After Harald's death, his brother Cnut was recognized as King of Denmark (possibly not until 1019).

No information has been preserved regarding the burial place of Harald II.

== Legacy ==
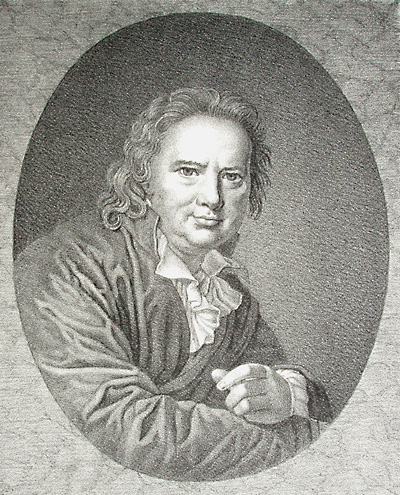
P. F. Suhm mentions Harald II in his works, though he does not give him an in-depth treatment.

Primarily because domestic chroniclers such as Saxo Grammaticus and Sven Aggesen do not mention Harald in their writings (nor does an otherwise frequently cited writer like Adam of Bremen), and because the exact year of his death is unknown, Harald has often been portrayed as a king about whom very little is known. Consequently, no book has ever been published focusing primarily on this monarch. (Note: From 1969 to 1999, a history thesis was written at the University of Copenhagen that tried to precisely determine the year Harald died.) In 1646, Albert Haelwegh produced a series of portraits of all Danish kings from the legendary king Dan up to Christian IV, collected in the work Regum Daniæ icones.Alb. Haelwegh: Regum Daniæ icones: Accurate expressæ, København, 1646. This work possibly features the first portrait of Harald II (as king no. 68 in the series), though the stated length of his reign and year of death differ considerably from what is known today (in reality, this appears to be a case of carelessness, as Harald II was given the same reign length and year of death as his grandfather, Harald Bluetooth Wikimedia Commons: Harald Blauzahn († 987) in einer Darstellung aus dem 17. Jahrhundert). Looking at several other portrait depictions of the Danish monarchs published in the 17th and 18th centuries, Harald II is entirely absent from nearly half of these portrait collections and biographies; thus, the challenge of firmly establishing Harald II in his rightful place in the royal lineage had not yet found a clear and final resolution at that time.

The prominent Danish historian P. F. Suhm mentions Harald a few times in his Historie af Danmark, yet he does not dedicate an independent section to him, instead discussing him in passages within the section on Cnut the GreatPeter Frederik Suhm: Historie af Danmark. III. Tome fra Aar 942 til 1035.. København, 1787.—and it has largely been Harald's fate throughout history to be treated as secondary in favor of his far more famous brother. (Note: I "Regum Daniæ icones" fra 1646 udtrykkes det på vers på denne vis (1. halvdel af verset): I Danmarck jeg vel Konge bleff - Oc raade for det Rige - Men hvad for Manddom jeg bedreff - Ved ingen aff at sige.)

In his 2005 popular history book, Fra Gorm til Margrethe, Carsten Overskov suggested that Harald II could be called "Harald the Forgotten". (Note: This tendency to treat Harald II as "Harald the Forgotten" superficially continued well into the 2010s, when the major three-volume prestige work Danmarks kongegrave ("The Royal Tombs of Denmark") was published by the Society for the Publication of Danish Monuments and Museum Tusculanum Press. In it, Harald II is given a two-page entry, one page of which consists of a full-page portrait. However, instead of a portrait of Harald II, the editors mistakenly included a portrait of his great-nephew Harald III Hen, accompanied by a correspondingly inaccurate caption. Harald II is not the only monarch in Danmarks kongegrave to be given the wrong portrait; the section on Eric Emune (r. 1134–1137) features a portrait that actually depicts his nephew and successor, Eric Lam. However, the section on Eric Emune also includes a second portrait clearly intended to represent him. However this is not extended to Harald II, and Harald is left without a portrait of his own in the work. Per Kristian Madsen and Karin Kryger: "Erik 2. Emune og Malmfrid". In Karin Kryger (red.): Danmarks kongegrave I, Museum Tusculanum Press, 2014, pp. 220–231.)

== Notes ==
Regnal titles
Preceded by Swein Forkbeard	King of Denmark; 1014–1018	Succeeded by Canute the Great
