= Orkesta Runestones =

11th-century runestones in Sweden

Coordinates: 59°36′N 18°07′E

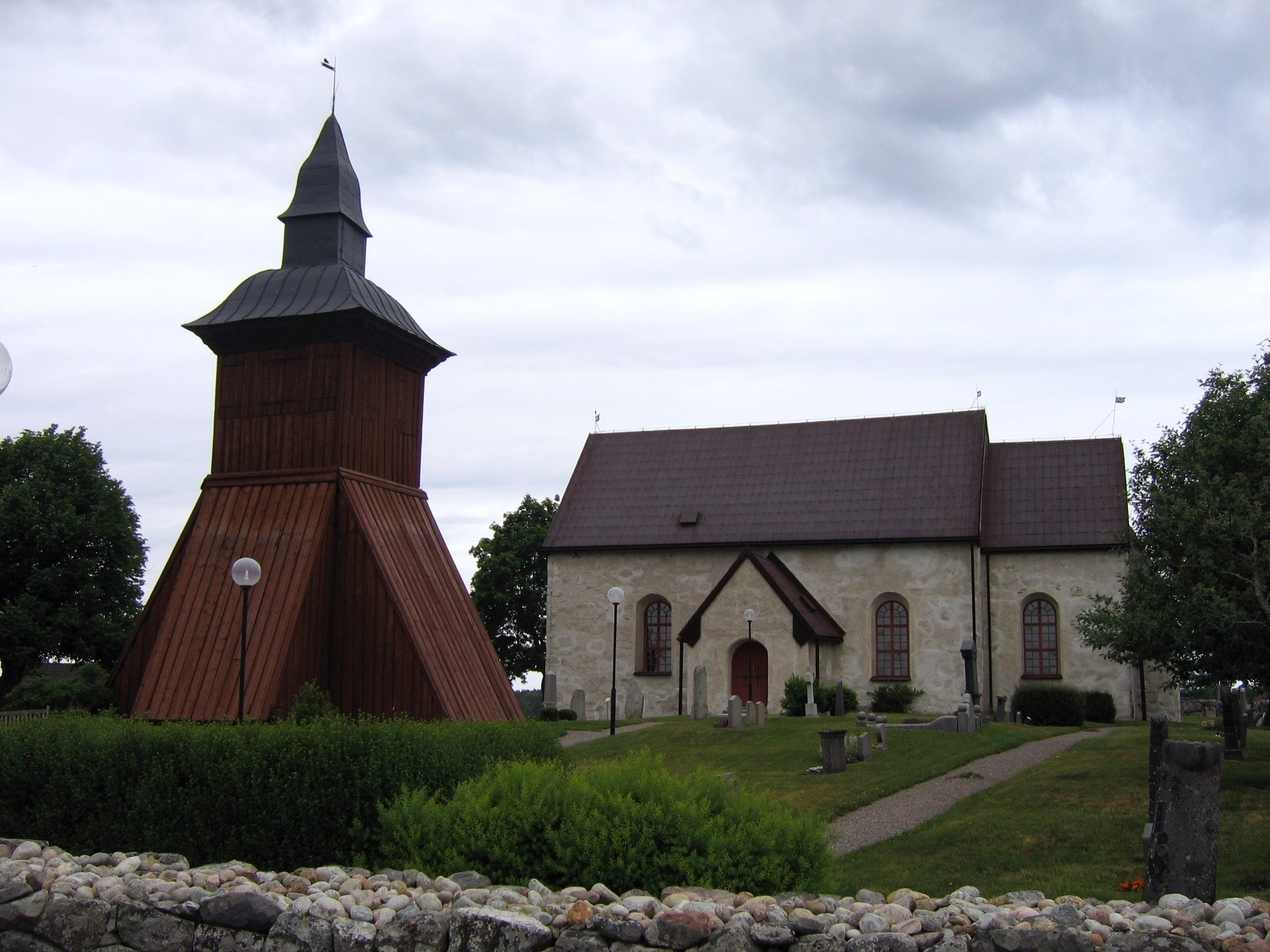
The church of Orkesta

The Orkesta Runestones are a set of 11th-century runestones engraved in Old Norse with the Younger Futhark alphabet that are located at the church of Orkesta, northeast of Stockholm in Sweden.

Several of the stones were raised by, or in memory of, the Swedish Viking Ulf of Borresta, who during the 11th century returned home three times with danegeld. The leaders of the three expeditions were Skagul Toste (Tosti), Thorkell the Tall (Þorketill), and Canute the Great (Knútr). This Ulfr also made the Risbyle Runestones in the same region, and he was mentioned on the lost runestone U 343.

There are two other runestones that mention the danegeld and both of them are found in the vicinity: runestones U 241 and U 194.

== U 333 ==
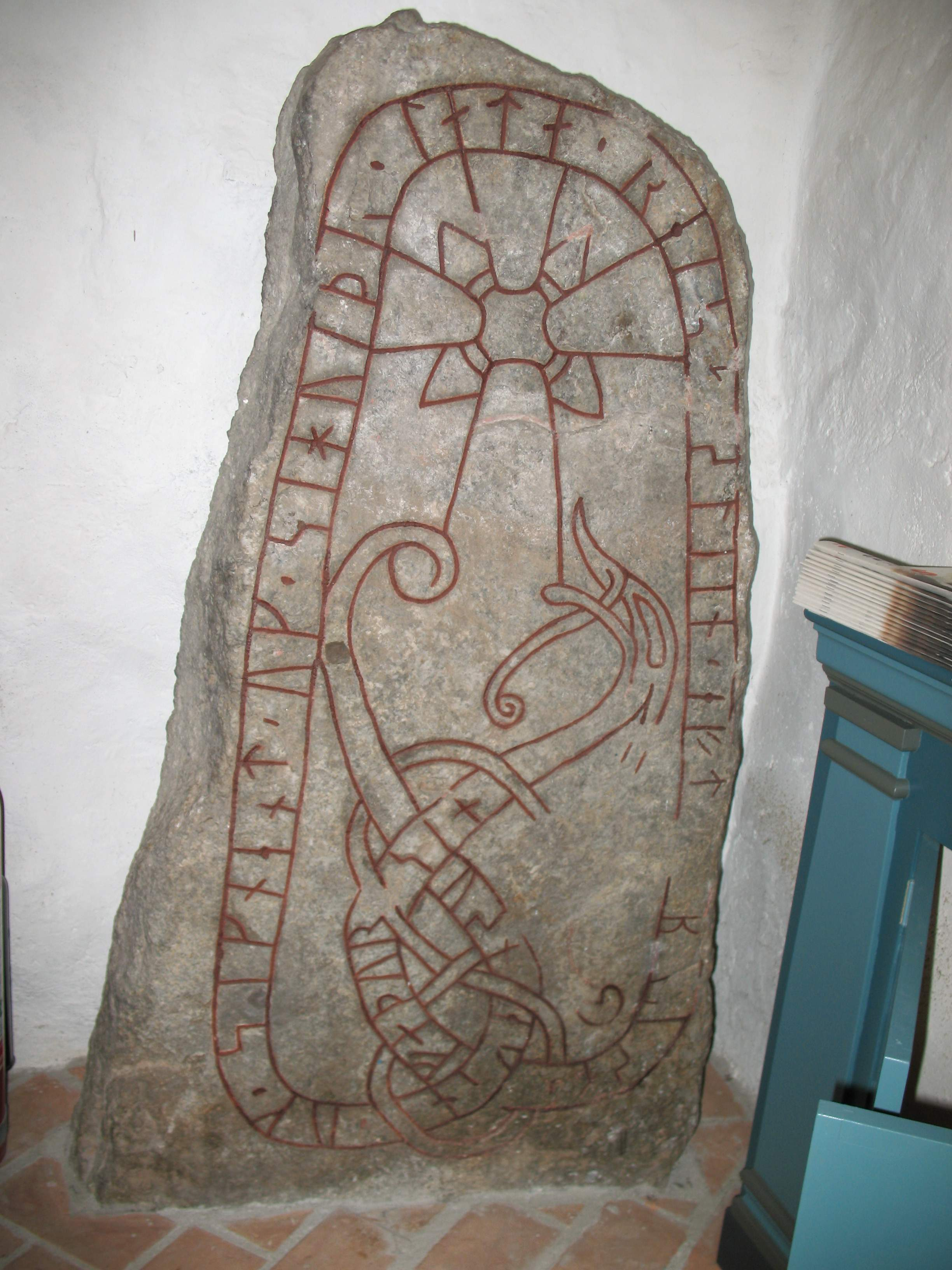
U 333

This runestone is in runestone style Pr3, which is also known as Urnes style. This runestone style is characterized by slim and stylized animals that are interwoven into tight patterns. The animals heads are typically seen in profile with slender almond-shaped eyes and upwardly curled appendages on the noses and the necks.

usnekin ' uk ' sikne(o)t ' uk ' sihuiþ(r) ' lata ' reis(a) s(t)iin ' eft[ʀ '] b[r](u)s(a) ' faþur sin
Osnikinn {} ok {} Signiutr {} ok {} Sigviðr {} lata {} ræisa stæin {} æftiʀ {} Brusa, {} faður sinn.
Ósníkinn and Signjótr and Sigviðr have raised the stone in memory of Brúsi, their father.

== U 334 ==
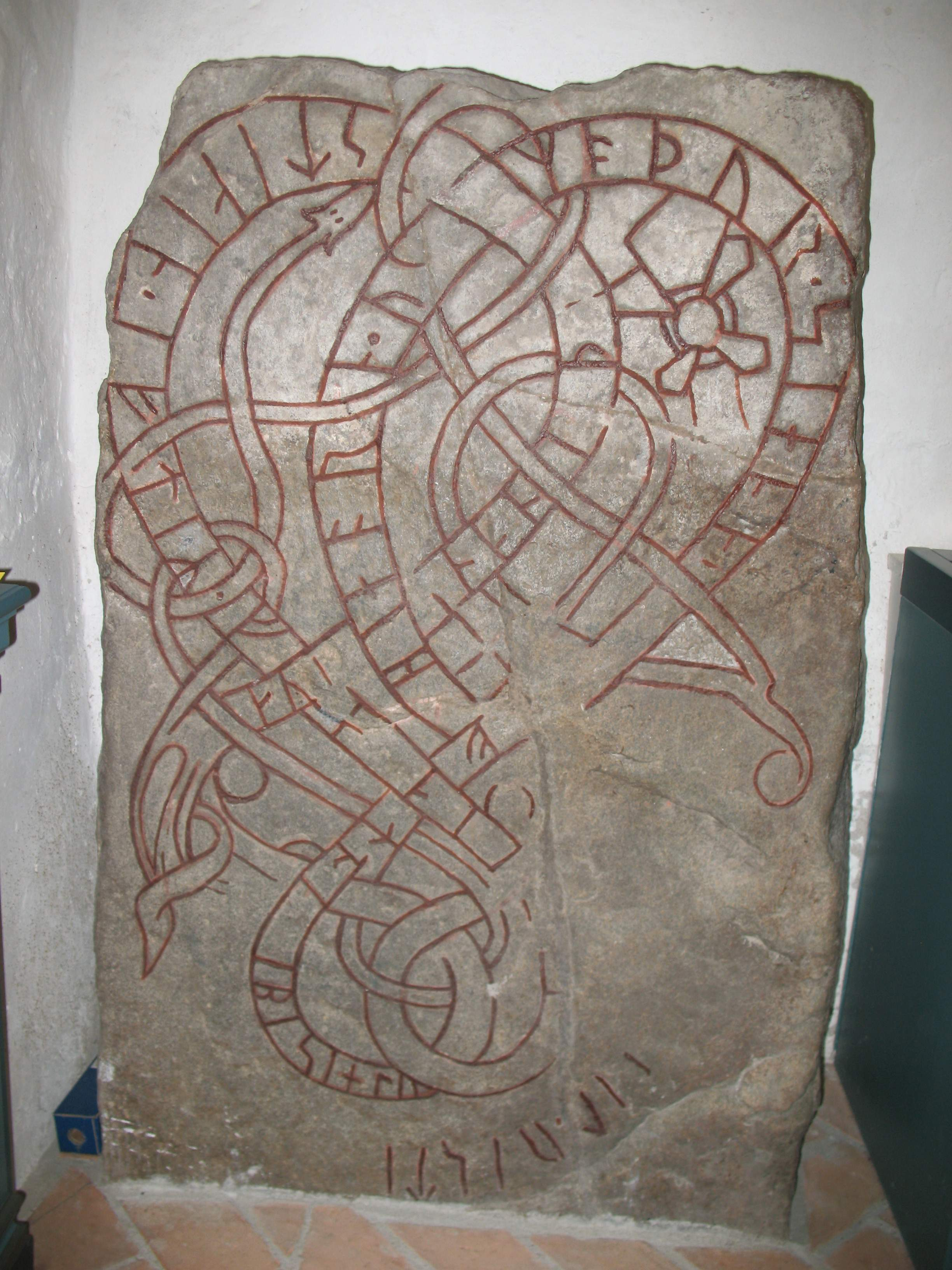
U 334

This runestone is in runestone style Pr4, which is also known as Urnes style.

(k)u[þs]n[o]n--þ[a]... stiain ' iftiʀ ' fa[þu]- ...[n] (b)iaorn * u(k) moþur * siena ' ...(f)(t)(n)-... ...-bi sialu ... [kt]il * risti
... stæin {} æftiʀ {} faðu[r] [si]nn Biorn {} ok moður {} sina {} ... [hial]pi sialu ... Kætill {} risti.
... the stone in memory of his father Bjôrn and his mother ... may help the soul ... Ketill carved.

== U 335 ==
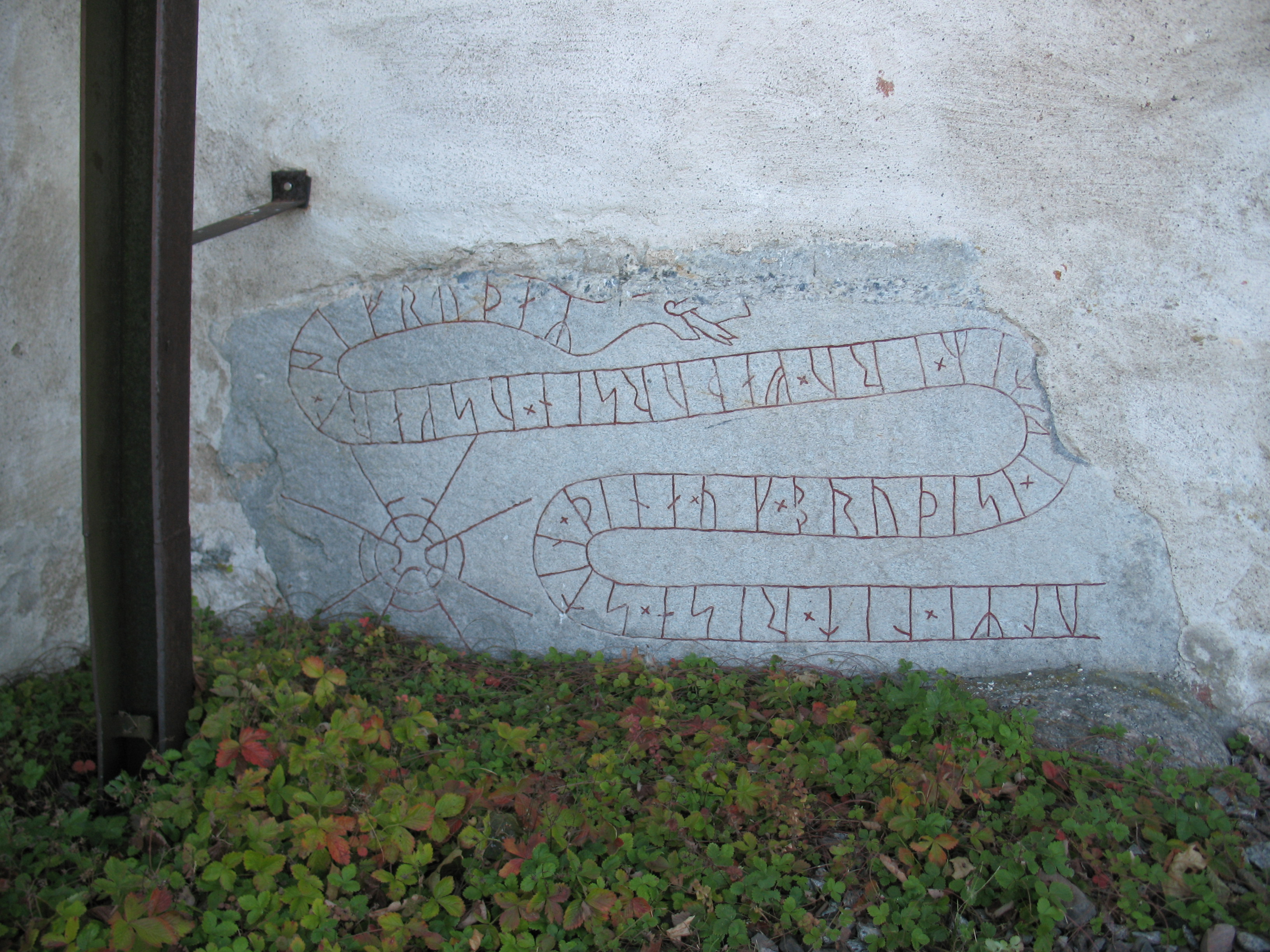
U 335

The runestone U 335 was raised to commemorate the building of a new bridge by Holmi. He dedicated the bridge and the runestone to his father Hæra, who was the Housecarl of a lord named Sigrøðr. The reference to bridge-building in the runic text is fairly common in rune stones during this time period. Some are Christian references related to passing the bridge into the afterlife. At this time, the Catholic Church sponsored the building of roads and bridges through the use of indulgences in return for intercession for the soul. There are many examples of these bridge stones dated from the eleventh century, including runic inscriptions Sö 101, U 489, and U 617. Like many other runestones, it was discovered in the walls of a church, where it still remains.

ulmi × lit × risa × stin × þina × uk × bru þisi × i(f)tiʀ × iru × faþur sin × uskarl × sifruþaʀ
Holmi {} let {} ræisa {} stæin {} þenna {} ok {} bro þessi {} æftiʀ {} Hæru(?), {} faður sinn, {} huskarl {} Sigrøðaʀ.
Holmi had this stone raised and this bridge (made) in memory of Hæra, his father, Sigrøðr's housecarl

== U 336 ==
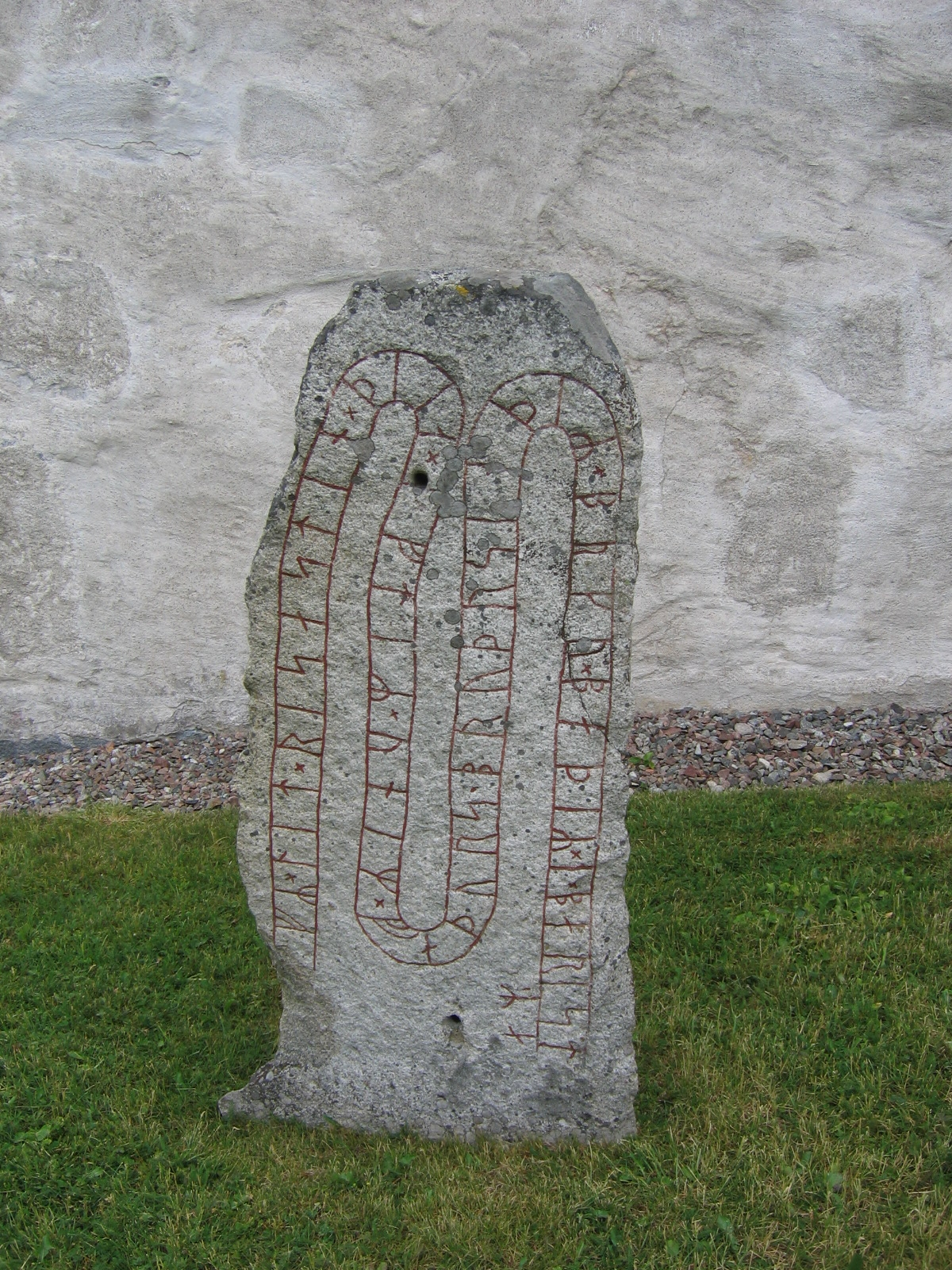
U 336

The runestone U 336 is raised by Ulf of Borresta, in memory of his uncle Ónæmr. Ulf adds that they both lived at Borresta (Old Norse: Báristaðir). The name Ónæmr, which means "slow learner," is also mentioned on two nearby runestones, U 112 and U 328, and so the three runestones are held to refer to the same person. This inscription is classified as being carved in runestone style RAK.

[ul]fʀ × lit × risa stin × þi[n]a × iftiʀ × unim × faþurs×bruþr sin þiʀ × buku × baþiʀ × i × baristam
Ulfʀ {} let {} ræisa stæin {} þenna {} æftiʀ {} Onæm, {} faðursbroður sinn. Þæiʀ {} byggu {} baðiʀ {} i {} Baristam.
Ulfr had this stone raised in memory of Ónæmr, his father's brother. They both lived in Báristaðir.

== U 343 ==
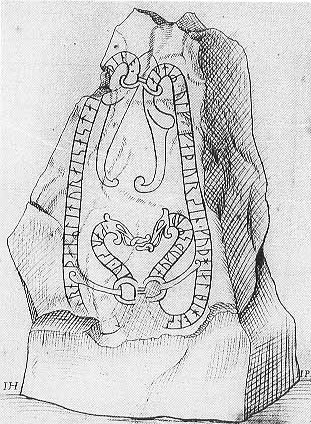
18th century drawing.

This runestone was possibly in style Pr3. It formed a monument together with U 344, below in Yttergärde. Although it has disappeared, the inscription was recorded during a survey of runestones in the 1700s. This runestone is attributed to the runemaster Åsmund, as is U 344. For the word moðiʀ, "mother," Åsmund left off the final ʀ rune. He also left off this final ʀ rune for the same word on U 241, on the word for "rune" on U 884, and possibly on the name Guðælfr on the now-lost U 1003.

[* karsi ' uk ...-rn þaiʀ litu raisa stai- þino ' aftiʀ ' ulf ' faþur sin ' kuþ hialbi hons ... auk| |kuþs muþi]
{} Karsi {} ok ... þæiʀ letu ræisa stæi[n] þenna {} æftiʀ {} Ulf, {} faður sinn. {} Guð hialpi hans ... ok Guðs moðiʀ.
Karsi and ... they had this stone raised in memory of Ulfr, their father. May God help his ... and God's mother.

== U 344 ==
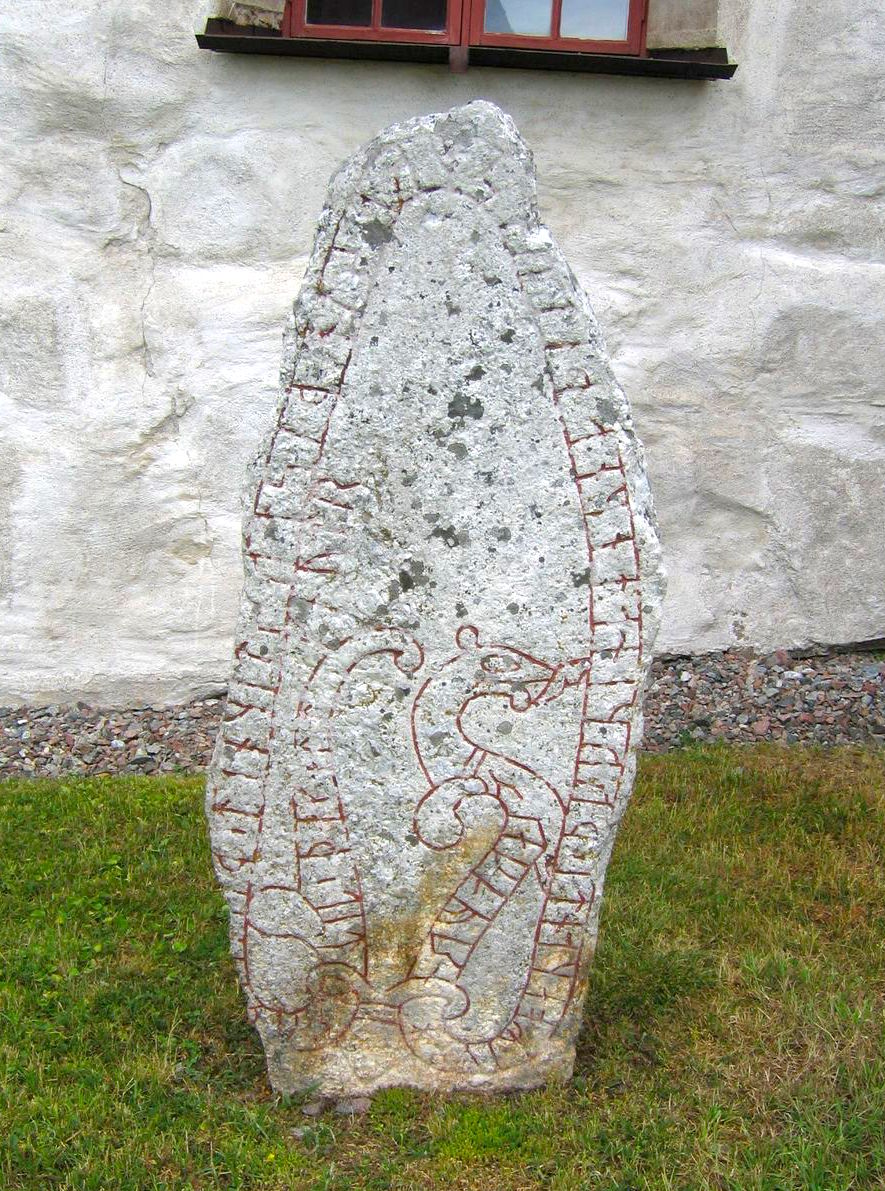
U 344

The runestone U 344, in the style Pr3, was found in 1868, at Yttergärde, by Richard Dybeck, but it is today raised at the church of Orkesta. The runes are written from right to left with the orientation of the runes going in the same direction, but the last words outside the runic band have the usual left-right orientation. It can be dated to the first half of the 11th century because of it still uses the ansuz rune for the a and æ phomenes, and because of its lack of dotted runes.

This stone is notable because it commemorates that the Viking Ulf of Borresta had taken three danegelds in England. The first one was with Skagul Toste, the second one with Thorkel the High and the last one with Canute the Great. Since there were many years between the danegelds, it is likely that Ulfr returned to Sweden after each danegeld to live as a wealthy magnate. It is a remarkable feat in itself to summarize his adventurous life in so few unsentimental words.

U 344 is considered to be one of the England runestones.

in ulfr hafiʀ o| |onklati ' þru kialt| |takat þit uas fursta þis tusti ka-t ' þ(a) ---- (þ)urktil ' þa kalt knutr
En Ulfʀ hafiʀ a Ænglandi {} þry giald takit. Þet vas fyrsta þet's Tosti ga[l]t. {} Þa [galt] Þorkætill. {} Þa galt Knutʀ.
And Ulfr has taken three payments in England. That was the first that Tosti paid. Then Þorketill paid. Then Knútr paid.

=== Link ===
Sveriges Runkarta

== See also ==
- List of runestones

== Sources ==
- Enoksen, Lars Magnar. (1998). Runor: Historia, Tydning, Tolkning. Historiska Media, Falun. ISBN 91-88930-32-7
- Gräslund, Anne-Sofie (2003). "The Role of Scandinavian Women in Christianisation: The Neglected Evidence". In Carver, Martin (ed.). The Cross Goes North: Processes of Conversion in Northern Europe, AD 300-1300. Boydell Press. pp. 483–496. ISBN 1-903153-11-5.
- Källström, Magnus (2008), "En Tidigare Okänd Österledsfarare Från Rasbo: Till Tolkningen av Inskriften på Fröstunastenen U 1003" (PDF), Fornvännen, 103 (3): 241
- Pritsak, Omeljan. (1981). The Origin of Rus'. Cambridge, Mass.: Distributed by Harvard University Press for the Harvard Ukrainian Research Institute. ISBN 0-674-64465-4
- Project Samnordisk Runtextdatabas Svensk - Rundata
- Information provided on location by the Swedish National Heritage Board.
