= Ring of Sweden =

Proto-historic King of the Swedes
- Reign: c. 936 or earlier
- Predecessor: Olof
- Successor: Eric Ringsson
- House: Munsö (?)

Ring was a Swedish monarch or local ruler who ruled at Uppsala, an important early Swedish political center, around or before the year 936. He either ruled before or together with his two sons Eric and Emund. Virtually nothing is known about him beyond his name.

== Bishop Unni's visit ==
The Archbishopric of Bremen had conducted Christian mission in Central Sweden during the 9th century, but the effort lapsed in the second half of the century for various reasons. The German Kingdom came into closer contact with Scandinavia when King Henry the Fowler defeated the Danes in 934 and gained influence in the important emporium Hedeby in South Jutland. The German ecclesiastic chronicler Adam of Bremen, writing in c. 1075, relates that the Archbishop of Hamburg-Bremen, Unni, arrived to Denmark to appoint priests for the churches in the realm. From Denmark he traveled over the Baltic Sea and arrived, with some discomfort, to Birka in the Swedish kingdom. This happened in 935 or 936. According to Adam, almost no Christian teachers had visited Birka for seventy years. "The believer in the Lord went ashore in this port and proceeded to make contact with the population for his unusual purpose. For the Swedes and Geats, or to put it better, the Norsemen, had, during the period of barbaric raids of conquest, when many kings exercised a bloody rule during a few consecutive years, entirely forgotten the Christian religion and could not now be easily persuaded to believe in it. I have heard from the often-quoted King Sweyn (of Denmark, ruled 1047-1076), that the Swedes at this time were ruled by a certain Ring together with his sons Eric and Emund. This is the same Ring who was preceded by Anund, Björn and Olof, about whom one may read in the biography of Ansgar, and others who are not mentioned. And it is likely that the warrior of God, Unni, turned to these kings although they were not believers, and preached the word of God in the land of the Swedes with their permission ... Swedes and Geats, among whom the Holy Ansgar had first spread the seeds of faith, but reverted to paganism, were once again called to faith by the Holy Father Unni ... When the messenger of God had completed his missionary task and eventually decided to go home, he fell ill in Birka and left his tired body there."

== Name and place ==
Unni died on 17 September 936, though it is unclear if Adam's assertion of him and King Ring being contemporaries is the author's guesswork. King Ring is not mentioned in the Norse king lists and sagas, such as Hervarar saga ok Heiðreks. The name is however borne by the Swedish ruler who was victorious in the legendary Battle of Bråvalla, Sigurd Ring. It is not otherwise attested among the members of the Viking Age royal family. It has sometimes been speculated that his true name was Olof (Anlaufr), represented in Latin chronicles as Anulo, which could have been misinterpreted as Latin annulus, meaning "ring". There has also been some speculation about the location of Birka where Unni died. A runic inscription on a cross at the church of Sund in Åland has been interpreted by local scholars as Wini (Unni), which would call for a radical reinterpretation of the historical geography of Viking Age Sweden. The dominating view among historians and archaeologists is nevertheless that Birka was situated on Björkö in Lake Mälaren.

The German encroachment on Scandinavia, which resulted in Unni's visit, may also have alerted the rulers of Birka. The family of Danish rulers who were defeated in 934 is said to have come from Sweden, although this statement has been disputed by historian Niels Lund. At any rate Birka apparently had strong commercial relations with Hedeby. The fortifications of Birka were strengthened around 940 as the gravel walls were heightened, and palisades seem to have been erected.

== Later historian ==
According to Olov von Dalin, Ring was king of Västergötland son of earlier king Olof while Erik Anundsson ruled over Svealand being of another line of kings, ruling in a diarchy with Eric Anundsson. According to Dalin, Inge or Igor was a surname for Ring. According to Dalin, Inge lead an unsuccessful Viking raid against France and faced defeat by Hugh the Great that defeated the Swedish raiding party. In Frankish sources, he is called Incon. Eric Anundsson, according to Dalin, died in battle against Frankish troops, and Ring or Inge ruled Sweden while Björn Eriksson was still a child.

== See also ==
- Early Swedish History

Ring of Sweden House of Munsö
Preceded by Olof	King of the Swedes	Succeeded by Eric Ringsson
