= Sture Bolin =

Swedish university teacher and writer (1900-1963)

Sture Bolin (1900–1962) was a Swedish historian whose most influential work focused on late Roman and early medieval trade routes, formulating an alternative to the Pirenne Thesis.

He was born in Höganäs in 1900, and studied under Lauritz Weibull. In 1938 he became Professor of History at Lund University. He died in Lund in 1962.
