= Eric the Victorious =

King of Sweden (970–995)

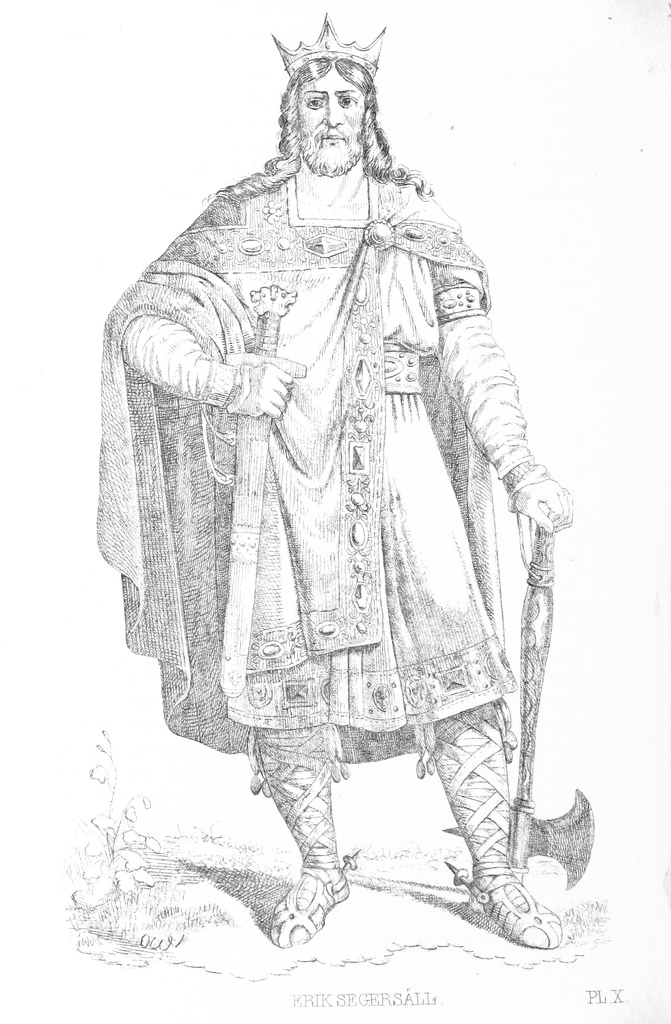
- An illustration of Eric the Victorious by Gustaf Henrik Mellin, published in the Scandinavian history book Den Skandinavska Nordens Historia in the nineteenth century.

King of Sweden
- Reign: c. 970 – c. 995
- Successor: Olof Skötkonung
- Born: c. 945
- Died: c. 995
- Burial: Old Uppsala
- Consorts: Sigrid the Haughty (?); Świętosława (?) Gunhild of Wenden (?); Aud Haakonsdottir of Lade (?)
- Issue: Olof Skötkonung and daughter of unknown name
- House: Munsö
- Father: Björn Eriksson (?); Emund Eriksson (?)
- Religion: Pagan, possibly briefly Christian

Eric the Victorious (Note: Some sources have referred to Eric the Victorious as either King Eric V or Eric VI. Whether or not there were any Swedish monarchs named Eric before Eric the Victorious is disputed, with some historians claiming that there were several earlier Erics, and others questioning the reliability of the primary sources used and the existence of these earlier monarchs. The list of monarchs after him is also uncertain in a few brief early periods, which makes the assignment of any numeral problematic (see Eric and Eric and Erik Årsäll) whether counting backward or forward.) (Old Norse: Eiríkr inn sigrsæli, Swedish: Erik Segersäll; c. 945 – c. 995) was King of Sweden as of around 970. Although there were earlier Swedish kings, he is the first Swedish king in a consecutive regnal succession, who is attested in sources independent of each other, and consequently Sweden's list of rulers usually begins with him. His son Olof Skötkonung, however, is considered the first ruler documented to definitely have been accepted both by the original Swedes around Lake Mälaren and by the Geats around Lake Vättern. Adam of Bremen reports a king named Emund Eriksson before Eric, but it is not known whether he was Eric's father. The Norse sagas' accounts of a Björn Eriksson are considered unreliable.

== Eric's kingdom ==
His original territory was in Uppland and neighbouring provinces. He acquired the epithet of Segersäll – Victorious or literally blessed with victory – after defeating an invasion force from the south in the Battle of Fýrisvellir which took place near Uppsala. A brother of Eric's named Olof allegedly being the father of Styrbjörn the Strong, Eric's main opponent in that battle, is part of the traditions about them.

The extent of Eric's kingdom is unknown. In addition to the Swedish heartland around lake Mälaren it may have extended down along the Baltic Sea as far south as Blekinge. According to Adam of Bremen, and Saxo Grammaticus he was also King of Denmark after defeating King Swein Forkbeard. The Stone of Eric also describes a Swedish attack against Denmark as mentioned by Adam of Bremen.

According to the Flateyjarbok, his success was largely due to an alliance with free farmers against an earl-class nobility, but archaeological findings suggest that the influence of that class diminished during the last part of the tenth century. Eric probably introduced a system of universal conscription known as ledung in the provinces around Mälaren.

In all probability he also founded the town of Sigtuna, which still exists and where the first Swedish coins were minted for his son and successor King Olof.

== Saga sources ==
Eric the Victorious is named in a number of sagas, Nordic tales of history preserved from oral tradition. In various stories, he is described as the son of a Björn Eriksson and as having ruled together with his brother Olaf. One saga describes his marriage to the infamous Queen Sigrid the Haughty, daughter of a legendary Viking, Skagul Toste, and how in their divorce he gave her all of Gothenland as a fief. According to Eymund's saga he then took a new queen, Aud, daughter of Haakon Sigurdsson, ruler of Norway.

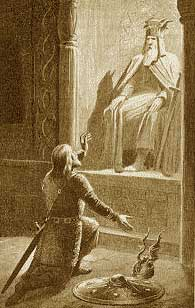
Eric praying to Odin before the Battle of Fýrisvellir, as envisioned by Twentieth century artist Jenny Nyström

Before that, Eric's brother Olaf died, and a new co-ruler was to be appointed, but the Swedes allegedly refused to accept Eric's rowdy nephew Styrbjörn as such. Eric granted Styrbjörn 60 longships in which he sailed away for a seafaring existence as a Viking. He became the ruler of Jomsborg and an ally of Danish King Harold Bluetooth, whose daughter Tyra he married. Styrbjörn returned to Sweden with an army, although Harold and the Danish troops seem to have turned back. Eric won the Battle of Fýrisvellir, according to Styrbjarnar þáttr Svíakappa, after making sacrifice to Odin and promising that, if victorious, he would give himself to Odin in ten years.

Two skaldic verses by Thorvaldr Hjaltason describe the alleged battle. The first expressly mentions how an Eric has utterly defeated an enemy host at a fortification at Fýrisvellir, while the second specifies that the Vikings were superior in numbers but nevertheless were handily captured when they attacked Sweden, and only those who fled survived. The runestones of Hällestad and Sjörup in Scania, then a part of Denmark, do mention a battle at Uppsala characterized by the defeat and flight of the attackers. These stones have traditionally been associated with the battle, but they also present chronological problems and may be from the next century.

Saxo Grammaticus also mentions that Eric ruled over Denmark for seven years after an invasion. He does not question the validity of the Swedish conquest of Denmark and claims that the Swedish invasion of Denmark was retaliation for Harald Bluetooth's support of Styrbjörn the Strong. Saxo, unlike Adam of Bremen, mentions that Eric defeated Swein Forkbeard's army decisively in a battle in Scania for the throne of Denmark. Snorri Sturlasson also mentions that Eric in a manly manner defended the realm from invaders and that he expanded the Swedish realm manfully.

According to Yngvars saga víðförla, Eric also had a beautiful daughter. A Swedish chief named Åke desired her. Eric, however, forbade his marriage proposal, since he knew a king in Russia that he wanted to marry her off to. Åke also was an unworthy man for his daughter. The saga uses the word fylkeskonung to describe the Russian king. The fylkeskonungs all paid tributes to the Uppsala king according to the Ynglinga saga and are described as client kings of the kings of Uppsala. Sometimes it means petty king.

Eric thus married her off to the Russian king. After that marriage took place, Åke got jealous and angry at the Russian king for taking his love. He retaliated by traveling to Russia, killing the king and taking Eric's daughter. Åke then allied himself with eight powerful Swedish jarls to avoid retaliation by Eric. Eric would not risk a confrontation since that would lead to much bloodshed and possibly civil war. For some years, nothing happened and Åke had a son Emund, father of Ingvar the Far-Travelled, leader of the Rus expedition to the Caspian Sea. Eric and Åke later had a good relationship and became friends once again.

Later on, the Norwegian regent Haakon Jarl agreed to give his daughter Aud as wife to King Eric. Wedding festivities were prepared and grandees arrived to Uppsala from all over Eric's realm. Haakon Jarl was however not keen on accepting an enforced in-law sitting as high as himself. He therefore induced Eric to do something against Åke as his actions against the king must be punished. While the festivities were unfolding, Eric prepared his revenge. In the beginning, Åke kept his guard but became more careless as the feasting proceeded. In the night after the feast, Eric and Haakon assaulted Åke and his men and slaughtered them together with the eight chiefs who had supported Åke. Their property was confiscated. He nevertheless spared his daughter and the child Emund and brought them home with him. Emund was raised as his grandson and later appropriated the properties of Åke and the eight chiefs.

== Adam of Bremen ==
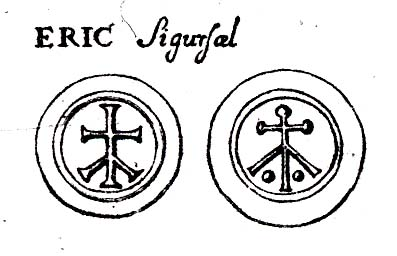
In 1691 coin expert Elias Brenner published designs allegedly used by King Eric, but a minting of coins by Eric is unknown to modern scientists, and these attributions are considered inaccurate. (Note: Brenner's methods are not considered reliable on early medieval Swedish coins.)

German ecclesiastic chronicler Adam of Bremen (around 1075) provides by far the oldest narrative about King Eric, and it differs substantially from the sagas. As his source he refers to the current King Sweyn II of Denmark whom he interviewed for his chronicle. Adam of Bremen also uses a similar epithet as the sagas "Victorius" for Erik the "Powerful" or Erik the "Great" the Latin word "potentissimus". Adam places Eric's reign after that of a certain Emund Eriksson, without clarifying how they were related. He does not mention the Battle of Fýrisvellir but relates that Eric gathered a large army and invaded Denmark against King Swein Forkbeard. The direct reason for the attack is not given, but somehow it concerned an alliance between Eric and "the very powerful king of the Polans, Bolesław (992–1025). He gave Eric his sister or daughter in marriage". That princess has been identified as Gunhild of Wenden, in some Nordic sources the daughter of a king Burislev (Bolesław). According to other interpretations, she was identical with a woman known in later sagas as Sigrid the Haughty, whose name is possibly a misunderstanding of the Old Polish name Świętosława. Eric's invasion of Denmark was successful. Several battles were fought at sea, and there the Danish forces, attacked from the east by Slavs, were annihilated. After his victory, Eric kept Denmark for a time, while Swein was forced to flee, first to Norway, then to England, and finally to Scotland whose king received the refugee with kindness.

According to Adam, Eric's rule in Denmark coincided with increased Viking activity in northern Germany. A fleet of Swedish and Danish ships sailed up the Elbe and landed at Stade in Saxony. A Saxon army confronted the invaders but was badly defeated. Several prominent Saxons were captured and brought to the ships, while the Vikings ravaged the province with no resistance. One of the prisoners, a Margrave Siegfried, managed to escape at night with the help of a fisherman. The infuriated Vikings then maimed their remaining prisoners and threw them ashore. However, Siegfried and Duke Benno soon raised a new army and raided the Vikings encamped at Stade. Another Viking detachment was tricked deep into the desolate marsh of Glindesmoor by a captured Saxon knight and annihilated by pursuing Germans.

Adam characterises Eric as a heathen and initially very hostile to the Christian religion. Nevertheless, a number of missionaries were at work during his reign, foreigners as well as some belonging to recently converted Nordic families. Among them was Odinkar the Elder who preached in Funen, Zealand, Scania and Sweden. Eventually Eric agreed to baptism, presumably while staying in Denmark; and if so he was the first Swedish king to do so. Due to that significant event, missionaries were allowed to sail over from Denmark to Sweden where they "worked valiantly in the name of the Lord". After some time, Eric is said to have forgotten the Christian faith and reverted to the religion of his ancestors. When Eric died, Sveyn Forkbeard returned from exile and regained Denmark. He also is alleged to have married Eric's widow (whoever she was), mother of Eric's successor King Olof. Thus an alliance between the Swedish and Danish royal houses was created.

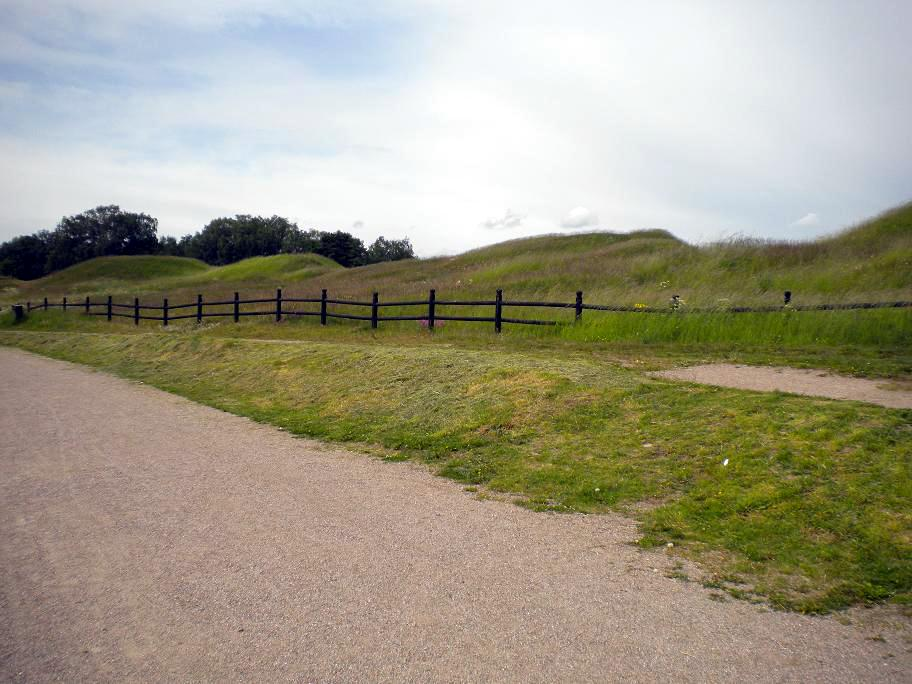
Swedish historians (Note: Birger Nerman, Åke Ohlmarks and Lars O. Lagerqvist have suggested that one of the smaller tumuli at Old Uppsala probably is King Eric's grave.) have suggested that the smaller tumuli at Old Uppsala probably include King Eric's grave.

Adam's account seems to date the death of Eric the Victorious between 992, when the accession took place in Poland of his ally Boleslaw I (above), and 995, when his son Olof's coinage began in Sigtuna. According to Snorre Sturlasson, Eric died in Uppsala. Discrepancies between Adam's account and other sources have led to a variety of interpretations among Swedish historians, especially about Eric's marriages. The details on his conquest of Denmark have been questioned. However, historian Sture Bolin considers it likely that the Swedish conquest of Denmark did occur, since it is supported by two partly independent sources (Saxo Grammaticus and Adam of Bremen, who got the information from the Danish king Sweyn II). Bolin also argues that Eric's invasion of the Holy Roman Empire (as described by Adam of Bremen), virtually requires Eric to have been the king of Denmark. In fact, Adam refers to several informants: "He [Sweyn II] said that Eric gained the rulership over two kingdoms, those of the Danes and the Swedes ... I heard from the very wise king of the Danes that Eric, after accepting Christianity, again reverted to paganism. However, that he fought against Otto III and was defeated, I heard from others". According to a recent evaluation by Harrison, the conquest "is not unlikely, at least if we consider it a loose suzerainty over powerful Danish lords".

The Stone of Eric, believed to have been raised in about 995 C.E., bears an inscription that Ludvig Wimmer identified as a possible description of an attack on Hedeby by king Swen against Swedish defenders who had occupied the settlement after king Eric's conquest.

The historian Peter Sawyer describes Adam's account as a "gross distortion" of what happened. Sawyer states that in 992 or 993 Svein defeated Eric, who died during the war or soon afterwards. Swein then married Eric's (unnamed) Polish widow as his wife, and his son and successor Olof acknowledged Swein's overlordship.

== Later historians ==
According to Olof von Dalin (1708–1763), Eric aided Vladimir the Great (978–1015) in a civil war with his brother Yaropolk I of Kiev (972–978). Without his leadership, Vladimir would have lost the war to Yaropolk. According to Dalin, Vladimir had to give territorial concessions to Eric and conceded the status of overlord to Eric in their relationship. After Eric's campaign, Sweden again achieved partial control over the countries in the east. During these events, his brother Olof's son Björn or Styrbjörn conspired to gain power with the Jomsvikings. While Eric stayed in the eastern tributary countries with Vladimir, Stybjörn built up his forces in collusion with the Wends, Danes and Jomsvikings to gain power himself. Apparently, Sigrid the Haughty was jealous of Olga in Kievan Rus, as being more famous and overshadowing her own glory, which made her angry at her husband Eric. Dalin's reconstruction is not verified by the original sources, but Russian chronicles indeed say that Vladimir fled overseas to the land of the Varangians, from whence he returned in 978 with an army of Varangian auxiliaries and gained power. Any involvement of Eric in the brothers' war is therefore possible but unproven.

== Family ==
Various sources and sagas (see above) list King Eric's wives as Sigrid, Świętosława, Gunhild and Aud, of which two or three may have been the same person but depicted differently and under different names. Such sources have also given Eric a total of four known children:

- Olof Skötkonung d. 1022, Eric's only historically attested child
- Emund, allegedly ruled over part of the realm under his brother Olof
- Holmfrid, sometimes credited as a daughter, not a sister, of Olof and married to Sweyn Haakonsson
- Daughter, married to an Åke and grandmother of Ingvar the Far-Travelled

Eric's nephew Styrbjörn and niece Gyrid were allegedly children of his semi-legendary brother and co-ruler Olof, mentioned in connection with Styrbjörn.

== See also ==
- List of Swedish monarchs
- Adam of Bremen
- Icelandic sagas

== Notes ==
Erik Segersäll House of Munsö Born: c. 945? Died: c. 995
Regnal titles
Preceded by Emund Eriksson? (Adam of Bremen); Björn Eriksson? (Norse sagas)	King of Sweden; 970? – c. 995	Succeeded by Olof Skötkonung
