= Emund Eriksson =

King of Sweden
- Reign: around 970
- House: House of Munsö
- Father: Erik Ringsson
- Religion: Norse Paganism

Emund Eriksson (?-c. 970) was a Swedish king whose historicity is only known from a single source, the Gesta Hammaburgensis ecclesiae pontificum which was written by Adam of Bremen in c. 1075.

== Reign ==
According to Adam of Bremen, a certain King Ring ruled the Swedes together with his sons Erik and Emund in about 936. In a later chapter, Adam mentions Emund Eriksson as ruling Sweden some time in the second half of the 10th century. He was presumably the son of Erik Ringsson. Adam relates that Emund was king at the same time as King Harald Bluetooth of Denmark (c. 958/64-985) expanded his power overseas and subdued Norway (in about 970). Emund was an ally of Harald, and showed a friendly attitude to Christian people who came to him. That German missionary efforts were renewed about this time is related by Adam in the following chapter. The Archbishop of Hamburg-Bremen, Adaldag (937-988), appointed a Dane called Odinkar the Elder for the Swedish lands. Being a pious man of noble stock, he could "easily convince the wild peoples about everything concerning our religion".

== Dynastic position ==
Emund Eriksson is not known to the later Norse sagas and king-lists. Information about him may have come from Adam's interview with the Danish King Sweyn Estridsen, Harald Bluetooth's great-grandson. To the extent that he is historical, he may have ruled in the third quarter of the 10th century. The next Swedish king mentioned by Adam of Bremen is Eric the Victorious (died c. 995), but he does not tell how they were related. Nevertheless, the name Emund was common in the late Viking Age dynasty of Sweden, but extremely rare outside of it, which suggests a dynastic continuity. An option is that Emund Eriksson was the brother of Björn (III) Eriksson, who the Norse sagas name as the son of Eric Anundsson and the father of Eric the Victorious. This would have been in accordance with the Germanic system of co-rulership (Diarchy) in which two brothers were elected kings and which, according to the sagas, was sometimes used by the Swedes. If this is the case, several generations of Swedish rulers were conflated by tradition, explaining the differences between Adam of Bremen and the Norse sagas.

== Later historian ==
According to Olov von Dalin Emund was king of Götaland son of earlier king Ring while Björn Eriksson ruled over Svealand being of another line of kings. Ruling Sweden in a Diarchy with Björn. Björn having slightly more power for ruling over the main province.

== See also ==
- History of Sweden (800–1521)

Emund Eriksson House of Munsö
Preceded by Erik Ringsson	Semi-legendary king of Sweden	Succeeded by Eric the Victorious (historical)
