= Sambia =

Sambia may refer to:

- Sambia, Comoros, a town on the island of Mohéli in the Comoros
- Sambia (Papua New Guinea), a tribe of people in the Eastern Highlands Province of Papua New Guinea
- Junior Sambia (born 1996), Central African footballer
- Sambia Peninsula, Kaliningrad Oblast, Russia

== See also ==
- Sambians, an extinct Old Prussian tribe
- Zambia, a country in Africa
