= Birgitta Fritz =

Swedish historian (1935–2021)

Birgitta Fritz (January 1935 - August 11, 2021) was a longtime associate professor (docent) of history at the Stockholm University. In 1972, she completed her Ph.D. thesis Hus, land och län. Förvaltningen i Sverige 1250-1434, ("House, country and county. Administration in Sweden 1250-1434").
