= Skoglar Toste =

Viking chieftain

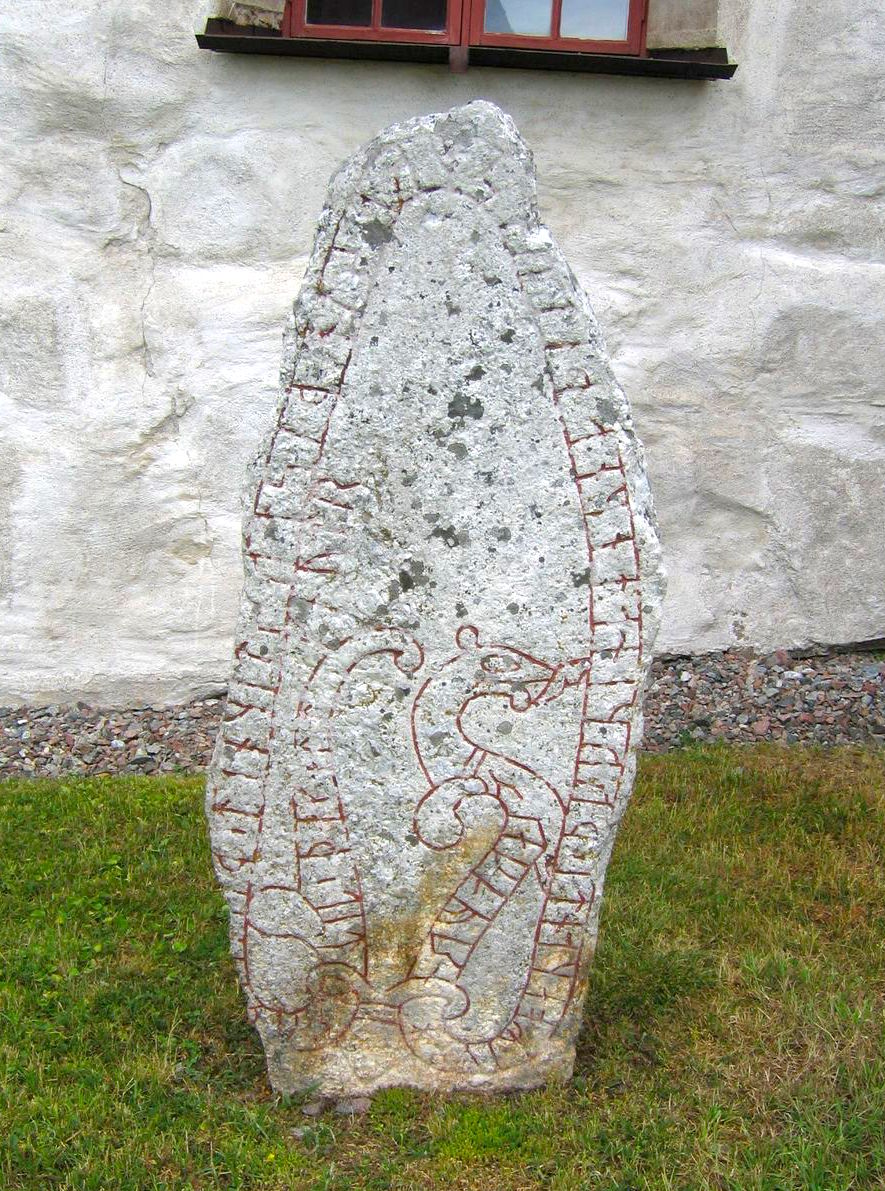
The rune stone U 344 in Orkesta, Uppland, Sweden, mentions a Toste who had led a successful expedition.

Skoglar Toste or Skoglar Tosti (there are several variations) is a legendary 10th century chieftain from the Swedish province of West Gothland. Snorri Sturlusson recounts in Heimskringla that he was a great Viking who often waged war and that is why he was called "Skagul's Tosti". Skagul was a Valkyrie.

Toste is mentioned in several sagas, most notable in Heimskringla. According to Snorri Sturluson, he was the father of Sigrid the Haughty. For some time he gave refuge to Harald Grenske, who later came back to woo Sigrid, only to be killed by her for his persistence. According to the sagas, Skoglar Toste was also the father of Ulf Tostesson, father of Ragnvald Ulfsson and grandfather of Stenkil who became the King of Sweden in 1060.

Toste has been connected to the U 344 runestone in Orkesta in Vallentuna, near Stockholm, which tells of how Ulf of Borresta three times took danegeld:

in ulfr hafiʀ o| |onklati ' þru kialt| |takat þit uas fursta þis tusti ka-t ' þ(a) ---- (þ)urktil ' þa kalt knutr

Translation:

"And Ulf of Borresta (ulfr) has taken three payments in England. That was the first that Toste (tusti) paid. Then Thorkell the Tall (Þurktil ) paid. Then Canute the Great (knutr) paid.

== Other sources ==
- Ancestral Roots of Certain American Colonists Who Came to America Before 1700 by Frederick Lewis Weis, Lines: 241–5, 243A-20
