= Orkesta =

Swedish parish

Coordinates: 59°36′N 18°07′E

Orkesta was a parish with 1103 inhabitants (2003), located in Vallentuna Municipality, Stockholm County in Sweden.

The Orkesta Runestones were discovered in a local Church. Orkesta Church in Vallentuna was built in the late 12th century.

The parish is since 2006 a part of Vallentuna parish.

== See also ==
- Orkesta Runestones
