= Sigrid the Haughty =

Scandinavian queen appearing in Norse sagas

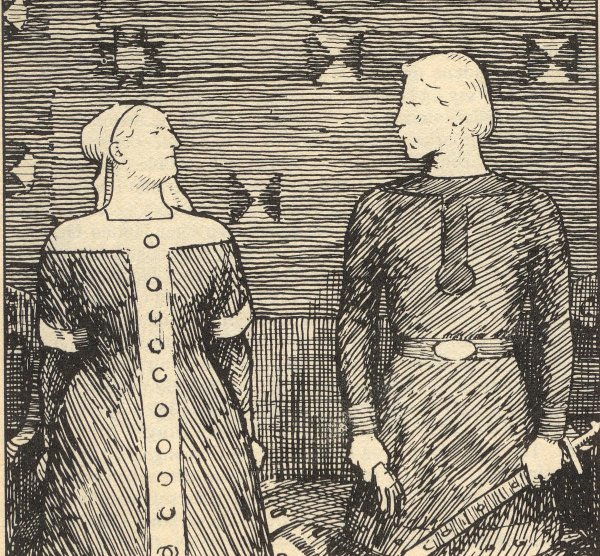
- Sigrid with Olaf Tryggvason as imagined by Erik Werenskiold

Queen consort of Sweden, Denmark, Norway and England
- Spouses: Eric the Victorious; Sweyn Forkbeard
- Issue: Olof Skötkonung; Emund
- Father: Skoglar Toste

Sigrid the Haughty (Old Norse: Sigríðr (hin) stórráða; Swedish: Sigrid Storråda) is a Scandinavian queen appearing in Norse sagas. Sigrid is named in several late and sometimes contradictory Icelandic sagas composed generations after the events the stories describe, but there is no reliable, historical evidence attesting to the veracity of her depiction in those tales. She is reported by Heimskringla to have been the wife of Eric the Victorious of Sweden, as being sought after by Olaf Tryggvasson, and then married to Sweyn Forkbeard of Denmark. Snorri Sturluson, however, says that Sweyn was married not to Sigrid but to a different woman.

It is unclear if the figure of Sigrid the Haughty was a real historical person. She appears primarily in late Icelandic sagas composed generations after the events. Scholars such as Birgitta Fritz consider her largely apocryphal, with saga accounts possibly drawing on folk motifs or conflating multiple women.

Some recent revisionist modern historians have hypothesized an identification with an unnamed Polish princess (later reconstructed by some as Świętosława) mentioned by medieval German chroniclers as a wife of Sweyn Forkbeard and possibly mother of Cnut the Great and Harald II. However, this remains a tentative and highly disputed theory. The potential husbands attributed to Sigrid in the sagas lived across a wide date range, and the identification relies on reconciling contradictory Norse and Continental sources. Gwyn Jones described her as "non-existent".

Mainstream Scandinavian and Anglo-Saxon scholarship, including works by Birgit Sawyer and other Northern European historians, tends to view Sigrid as a composite literary figure or semi-legendary construct rather than a single verifiable queen, but of possible Scandinavian origin. Recent Contemporary or near-contemporary sources like Thietmar of Merseburg mention a Polish or Wendish royal woman in Danish alliances but provide no support for the dramatic "haughty" traits or full saga biography. The maternal-link hypothesis is often criticized as speculative overreach, with no strong paternal-line or archaeological backing to elevate it beyond the idea of diplomatic marriage conjecture common in the Baltic region.

== Early accounts ==
Sigrid appears in the 12th-century saga Yngvars saga víðförla, which when speaking of Swedish King Eric the Victorious says:

Hann átti Sigríði ina stórráðu ok skildi við hana sakir óhægenda skapsmuna hennar, því at hún var kvenna stríðlyndust um allt þat, er við bar. Hann gaf henni Gautland. Þeira sonr var Óláfr svenski.
He married Sigrid the Proud and separated from her because of her difficult moods, for she was the most quarrelsome woman there ever was. He gave her Gautland. Their son was Olaf the Swede.

She also receives brief mention in the genealogical appendix to Hervarar saga ok Heiðreks, which likewise when discussing Eric states "He married Sigrith the Ambitious" ('Hann átti Sigríði ina stórráðu.'). This appendix is not found in the earliest-surviving manuscripts of the saga, rendering its dating uncertain.

== Accounts given in the Heimskringla and Separate Saga ==
Using earlier sagas as his sources, Snorri Sturluson gives a much more detailed account of Sigrid in several sagas within his 13th-century compilation, the Heimskringla. He first introduces her in Haralds saga gráfeldar, where he describes the upbringing of the Norwegian prince Harald Grenske, who fled to Sweden and there joined the raiding band of Skoglar Toste, described as the richest and most distinguished untitled man in the country, and staying with him the following winter. The saga then relates that Toste had a daughter Sigríd, who was young, fair and very haughty, and who later would marry Swedish king Eric the Victorious and become mother of King Olaf the Swede. Snorri returns to Harald and Sigrid in the next saga in the Hemskringla, Óláfs saga Tryggvasonar. Now a wealthy queen dowager and mother of King Olaf, and described by Snorri as "the wisest of women and prophetic about many things", she learns that her foster-brother Harald is nearby on his way to raid in the Baltic Sea, and she invites him to a banquet, and afterwards personally serves him in his chamber. However, Harald took offence the next day when she favorably compared her own possessions and power in Sweden to his in Norway, leaving Harald sullen in spite of the great gifts she gave him. After stewing over this for a season, Harald again raided the Baltic and visited Sweden on his return. Sending for Sigrid, he proposed that they marry. She dismissed this, pointing out that he already had a wife, Asta, who seemed compatible with him, but he insisted Asta, though noble and good, was not as high-born as he. After a few further cursory words, Sigrid rode away, and Harald again turned sullen before deciding to ride to her home to press his case. Taking a large body of men, he arrived to find another suitor also present, a king called Vissavaldr from Garðaríki. Both were housed in the same quarters, and served large quantities of drink, and then in the night she had her people set fire to the structure and kill anyone who made it out, declaring that this should prevent other petty kings from coming to her country to seek her hand. Snorri says that from thenceforth she was called Sigríðr in stórráða, "Sigrid of the Great Undertakings".

Later in the same saga, Snorri related Sigrid's wooing by Olaf Tryggvasson, the king of Norway. After exchanging messages, Olaf proposed they marry, and Sigrid agreed. In commemoration of this Olaf sent her a great gold ring he had taken as a prize, but Sigrid's goldsmiths discovered it to be only gold-plated brass, and this made Sigrid question his truthfulness. Then, when Olaf and Sigrid met in person, he insisted that in order to marry she must convert to Christianity, to which she responded, "I shall not abandon the faith that I have previously held, as have my kinsmen before me. I shall also make no objection to your believing in whatever god you like." In a rage, Olaf struck her with a glove, and Sigrid calmly told him, "That could well cost you your life", and they parted. After relating several of Olaf's subsequent activities, he returns to Sigrid, indicating that after the death of Gunhild, daughter of Burislav of the Wends and wife of Sweyn Forkbeard, King of Denmark, the Danish king had married Sigrid, daughter of Skoglar Toste, and through this relationship an alliance was formed between Sweyn and her son Olaf of Sweden, along with Sweyn's son-in-law, Jarl Eiríkr Hákonarson. Olaf had further offended the Danish king through the actions of Sweyn's sister, Tyri. Sent against her will to marry Burislav in fulfillment of a provision of the same treaty that had seen Sweyn marry his first wife, Burislav's daughter Gunhild, Tyri fled to Norway after the wedding, and there married Olaf. The two queens then goaded their husbands into conflict. This shared animosity would lead to the Battle of Swold, in which Olaf fell.

Sigrid does not appear in the next saga in the Heimskringla, Óláfs saga ins helga, but she is mentioned in a related text by Snorri, a stand-alone account of the same monarch now commonly called the Separate Saga of St. Olaf. This mentions her while giving very similar accounts of Harald Grenske to those found in Haralds saga gráfeldar and Óláfs saga Tryggvasonar, with the only novel information being another passage relating a marriage between Olaf Tryggvason's sister Ingibjorg, and Sigrid's nephew Jarl Rognvald, son of her brother Ulf. Sigrid makes one further brief appearance in the Heimskringla, in Magnúss saga ins góða. There she is described as mother of Estrid Svendsdatter, the paternal (half-)sister of Cnut the Great and maternal half-sister of Swedish king Olaf.

== Other appearances ==
The Danish historian Saxo Grammaticus has similar information as the Heimkringla, writing that Eric the Victorious' widow Syritha had married Sweyn Forkbeard after having spurned Olaf Trygvasson.

One further point that has been cited in favor of Sigrid's historical existence is that the holdings of the Danish kings in medieval Sweden were known as "Syghridslef"—'the legacy of Sigrid'.

== Contemporary chroniclers ==
There is exiguous material in medieval chronicles to provide details regarding the marriages of Sweyn of Denmark and Erik of Sweden:

- Thietmar of Merseburg mentions that the daughter of the Mieszko I of Poland and sister of Bolesław I Chrobry of Poland married Sweyn Forkbeard and gave him two sons, Cnut the Great and Harald II of Denmark, but he does not mention her name anywhere in this chronicle. Thietmar is probably the best informed of the medieval chroniclers addressing the question, since he was contemporary with the events described and well-informed about the events in Poland and Denmark. The assertion that Harald's and Canute's mother was Boleslaw's sister may explain some extremely mysterious statements which appear in medieval chronicles, such as the involvement of Polish troops in invasions of England, a very speculative and highly contested myth in itself according to the general consensus.
- Adam of Bremen writes almost a century later that a Polish princess—the sister or daughter of Bolesław I Chrobry of Poland—was the wife of Eric the Victorious and by this marriage the mother of Olof Skötkonung of Sweden, before she became mother of Cnut the Great and Harald II of Denmark in her second marriage with Sweyn. Adam's claims about the marriage to Eric are considered unreliable by many historians, since he is the only source to state this relationship and because he is writing several generations later. The scholia of Gesta Hammaburgensis ecclesiae pontificum mentions that it was the Polish king Boleslaw who gave the princess's hand in marriage. One problem is that Olof was born at latest in the early 980s, before Boleslaw Chrobry came to power, and therefore was too old to be the unnamed princess's son.

During this time, marriages between Nordic monarchs and Vendic noble women was reoccurring only for political reasons. For instance, Tove of the Obotrites, daughter of the Vendic lord Mistivoj, married King Harald Bluetooth of Denmark in the 960s.

- Gesta Cnutonis regis mentions in one short passage that Canute and his brother went to the land of the Slavs, and brought back their mother, who was living there. This does not necessarily mean that his mother was Slavic, although this chronicle may suggest that she was.

== Modern reconstructions ==
There are many alternative reconstructions. Some interpret the saga accounts of Sigrid as a confused rendering of a woman appearing in the historical record. Chronicler Thietmar of Merseburg reported that a daughter of first duke of the Polans Mieszko I, unnamed in the original source but hypothesized to have been named 'Świętosława' by some modern historians, married Sweyn, and by him was mother of Harald and Cnut, while writing slightly later Adam of Bremen reported that this same Polish princess had earlier married Eric, having Olaf by him. Sigrid could be either a contemporary name adopted by the Princess to conform to her new linguistic context, or else simply a name invented by saga writers who did not know or could not comprehend her Slavic name. This solution may further make her identical to the woman that the same saga gives as Sweyn's first queen, 'Gunhild', daughter of 'Burislav', suggested to be a confused rendering of the same historical marriage to the sister of Boleslav of Poland. This is not certain: the attributed Polish marriages of Sweyn and Eric may have been to different women, with Gunhild being the daughter of Mieszko, while Eric's widow, a distinct princess, may simply have been the dramatic model for Sigrid.

Finally, some consider Sigrid to be a fictional character created by Scandinavian saga writers.

== Suggested resting places ==
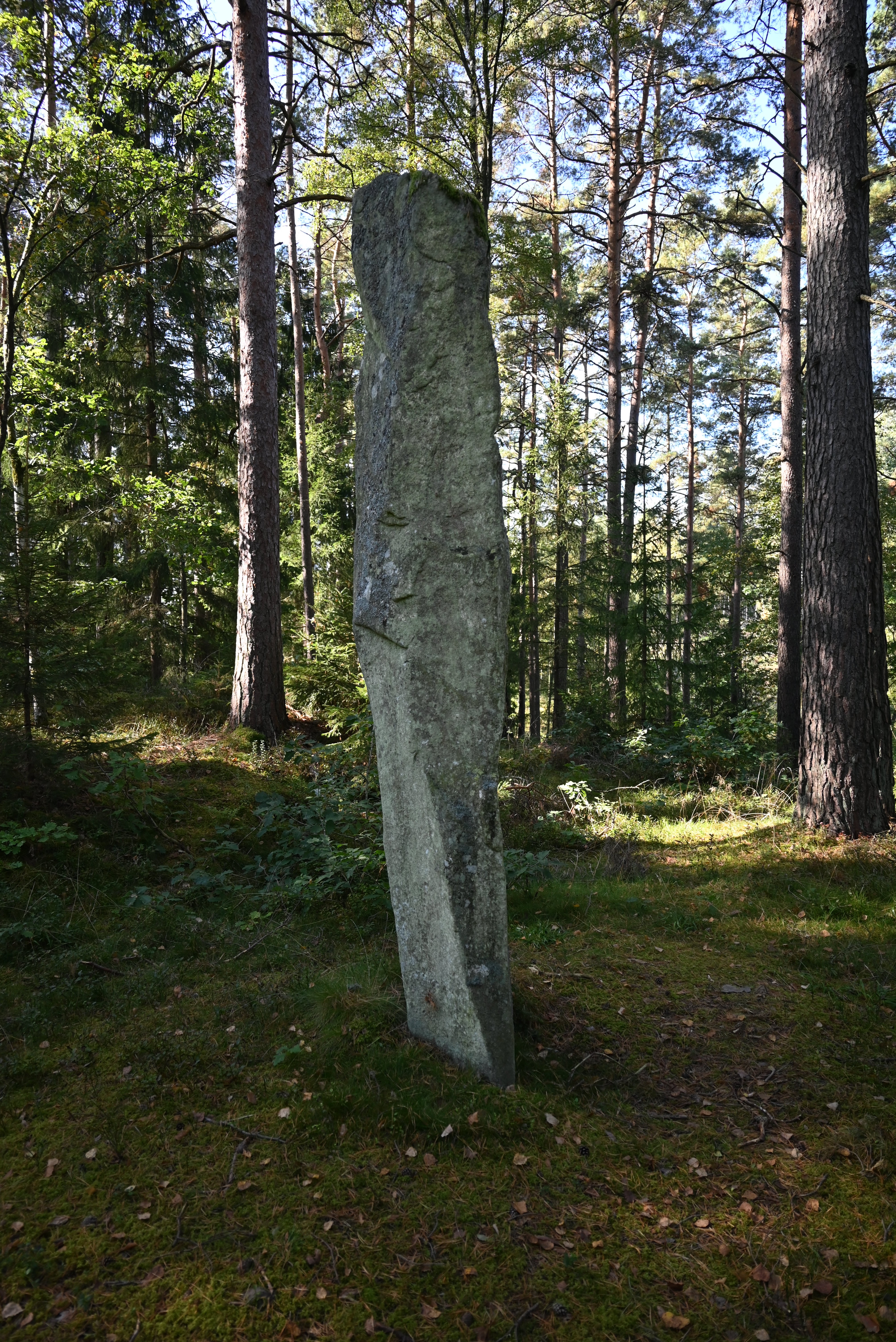
Pjukesten

Further confusion has been introduced by outdated interpretations of an archaeological discovery. In 1835, the Haraldskær Woman was discovered in a peat bog in Jutland. When originally found in the nineteenth century, this female body was dated to the 11th century, and it was identified as Sigrid (or Gunhild). Radiocarbon dating later proved this was incorrect, however, showing the remains are much older and probably not those of Sigrid. Despite this, the erroneous dating became intertwined with numerous episodes of Scandinavian intrigue, as the theory was elaborated to serve a variety of agendas of kings and nobles prior to its redating.

Another legend states that Sigrid is buried at the Puke Stone (Swedish: Pjukesten) along the Gotaleden hiking trail. Near the half-way point of the twelfth stage of that trail lies an ancient monumental stone just off the path in the forest. It is said to be the burial place of Queen Sigrid, erected by her son.

== In literature ==
Henry Wadsworth Longfellow composed a poem with the title "Queen Sigrid the Haughty" of which this is the first verse:

Queen Sigrid the Haughty sat proud and aloft
In her chamber, that looked over meadow and croft.
Heart's dearest,
Why dost thou sorrow so?

Karen Blixen, in the short story "The Deluge at Norderney" in Seven Gothic Tales, refers to Sigrid, claiming that she invited all her suitors to her house and burned them in order to discourage other suitors.

The story of Sigrid's life, loosely based on the Saga materials, is the focus of two novels by the Swedish writer and journalist, Johanne Hildebrandt: Sigrid (2014) and its sequel Estrid (2016).

There are three novels about the life and times of Sigrid the Haughty (treating her as identical to Świętosława):

- Elżbieta Cherezińska "Harda" (2016) ("The Haughty") and "Królowa" (2016) ("The Queen"),
- Maria Rawska-Mrożkiewicz "Świętosława: Córka Mieszka I, żona, matka skandynawskich Konungów" (1987) ("Świętosława: Daughter of Mieszko I, Wife, Mother of Scandinavian Kings")

== Bibliography ==
- Fritz, Birgitta (2004). "Sigrid Storråda". Svenskt Biografiskt Lexikon. Vol. 32.
- Jones, Gwyn (1984). A History of the Vikings. 2nd ed. Oxford University Press. ISBN 978-0-19-280134-0.
- Sawyer, Birgit (2000). The Viking-Age Rune-Stones: Custom and Commemoration in Early Medieval Scandinavia. Oxford University Press.
- Sawyer, Peter (1997). The Oxford Illustrated History of the Vikings. Oxford University Press.
- Thietmar of Merseburg (2001). Ottonian Germany: The Chronicon of Thietmar of Merseburg. Translated and annotated by David A. Warner. Manchester University Press.
- Adam of Bremen (1959). History of the Archbishops of Hamburg-Bremen. Translated by Francis J. Tschan. Columbia University Press.
- Snorri Sturluson (1964). Heimskringla: History of the Kings of Norway. Translated by Lee M. Hollander. University of Texas Press. (Primary saga source, but late and contradictory.)
- Morawiec, Jakub (2009). Knut Wielki: Król Anglii, Danii i Norwegii.
- Uspenskij, Fjodor (2014). Articles on dynastic networks in Baltic region (various).
