= Vidbo Runestones =

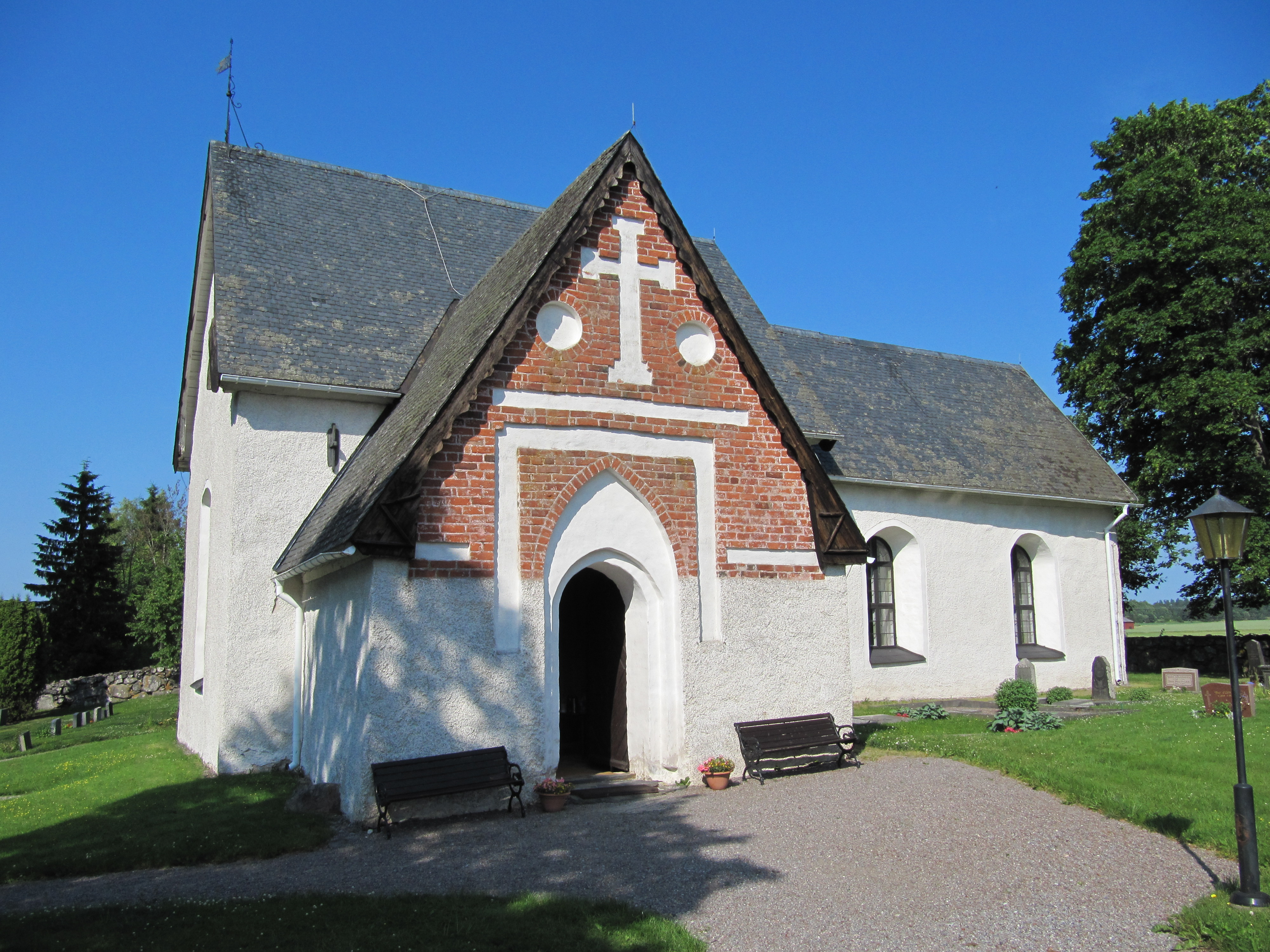
The church at Vidbo.

The Vidbo Runestones are two Viking Age memorial runestones located in the churchyard of the Vidbo church, about 10 km (6.2 mi) east of Knivsta, Uppsala County, Sweden, in the historic province of Uppland.

== U 375 ==
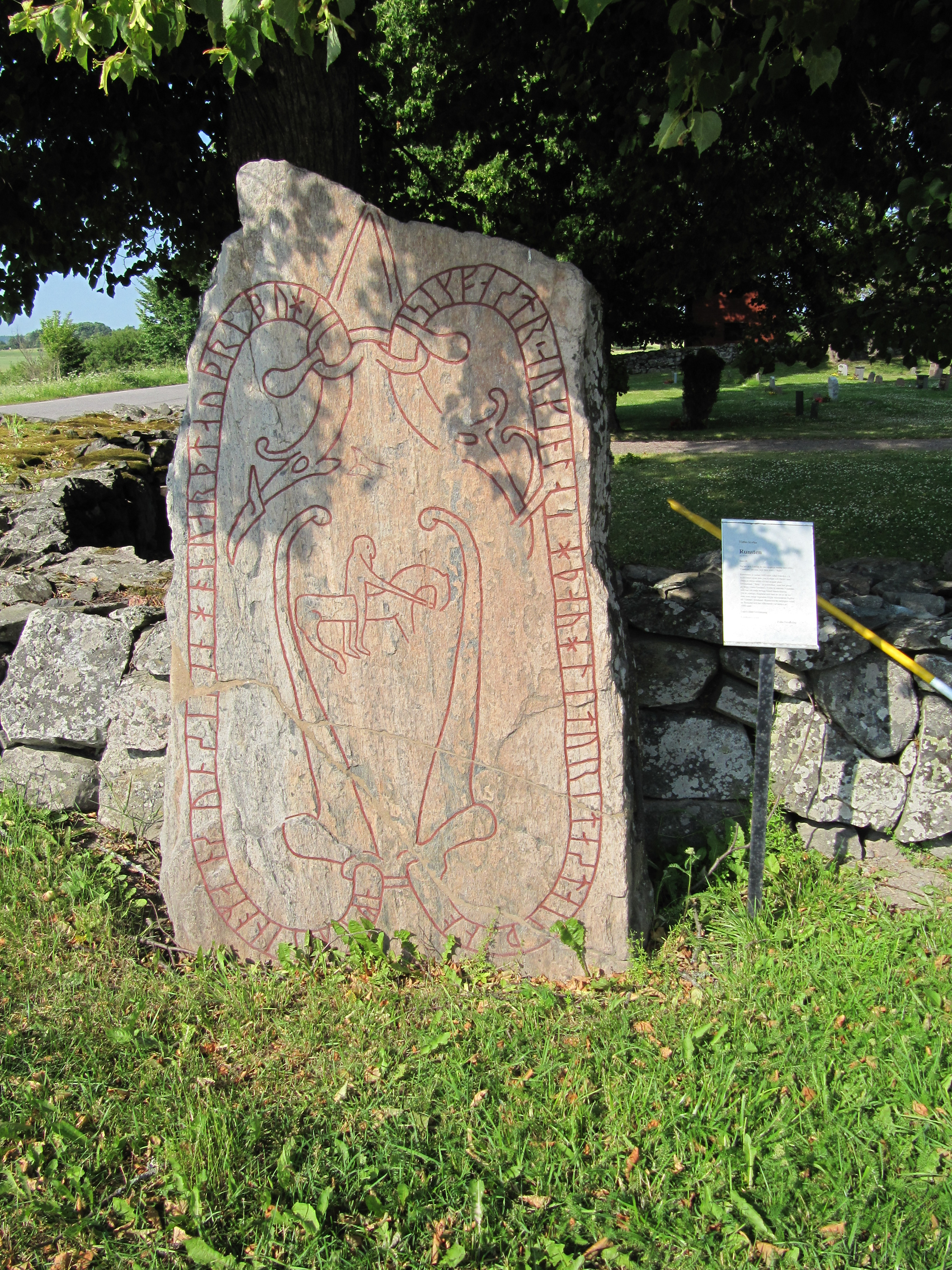
U 375 at the Vidbo Church.

Uppland Runic Inscription 375 or U 375 is the Rundata catalog listing for one of the granite runestones, which is 1.9 meters in height. It consists of runic text carved in the Younger Futhark on two serpents which bracket a figure on a horse and a bird. Several other Scandinavian runestones include depictions of horses, including DR 96 in Ålum, N 61 in Alstad, Sö 101 in Ramsundsberget, Sö 226 in Norra Stutby, Sö 239 in Häringe, Sö 327 in Göksten, U 488 in Harg, U 599 in Hanunda, U 691 in Söderby, U 855 in Böksta, U 901 in Håmö, U 935 at the Uppsala Cathedral, and U 1003 in Frötuna. The two serpents have fetters around their necks and, near the bottom of the inscription, their tails, perhaps intended to bind them to the stone. The runic text is read clockwise from the head of the right-hand serpent and then from the tail of the serpent on the left. The inscription is classified as being carved in runestone style Pr2, also known as Ringerike style. This is the classification for runic text bands that have attached serpent or beast heads depicted as seen in profile. U 375 was described by one runic scholar as being a "good example" of a stone carved in style Pr2. Records from the 17th century indicate that the runestone was in three pieces in the churchyard, where it was later reconstructed and raised.

The runic text states that the stone was raised by two parents named Sigfastr and Ginnlaug in memory of their son Vinaman, and that he died in a location listed in the text as buhi. While some scholars consider this location to be uninterpreted, others have suggested that it translates as Bógi and refers to a former Viking Age harbor in Gotland. The name Boge today survives for a Gotland synod. There are several other runestones which mention Gotland, including Sö 174 in Aspö, the now-lost U 414 in Norrsunda, U 527 in Frötuna, U 614 in Torsätra, DR 220 in Sønder Kirkeby, DR 259 in Fuglie, and possibly Sö 47 in Vålsta, where the text has been damaged. The runes aukinla-h on the stone, which translate as "and Ginnlaug," follow the rule that double consonants are represented with only a single consonant, even if one of the two consonants are at the end of one word and the second is at the beginning of the next word. The transliteration of the runic text for these words, auk| |kinla-h, shows word divisions and a separate k-rune for each of the two words.

=== Inscription ===
==== Transliteration of runic text into Latin letters ====
sikfastr ' auk| |kinla-h þauh litu rita stai(n) þino aftiʀ uinoman sun si- in hon uarþ tauþr i buhi

==== Transcription into Old Norse ====
Sigfastr ok Ginnla[u]g þaun letu retta stæin þenna æftiʀ Vinaman, sun si[nn]. En hann varð dauðr i Bogi(?).

==== Translation in English ====
Sigfastr and Ginnlaug, they had this stone erected in memory of Vinaman, their son. And he died in Bógi(?).

== U 376 ==
Uppland Runic Inscription 376 or U 376 is the Rundata catalog listing for the second runestone located in the Vidbo churchyard. The inscription is classified as being carved in runestone style Pr4, also known as Urnes style. This style is characterized by slim and stylized animals that are interwoven into tight patterns. The animal heads are typically seen in profile with slender almond-shaped eyes and upwardly curled appendages on the noses and the necks. The text indicates that the inscription was carved by a runemaster with a normalized name of Sten. U 376 is the only surviving runestone that was signed by this runemaster.

The runic text states that the stone was raised by Inga in memory of her son Ragni, who was the husband of a second sponsor named Ragnhildr. The inscription states that the sponsors also had a bridge made in memory of Ragni. The reference to bridge-building is similar to that on other runestones during this period. Some are Christian references related to passing the bridge into the afterlife. At this time, the Catholic Church sponsored the building of roads and bridges through a practice similar to the use of indulgences in return for the church's intercession for the soul of the departed. The text also refers to the raising of "stones," suggesting that a second runestone was also raised, with perhaps a stone originally located near each end of the bridge. Since U 376 is currently located at the Vidbo church, the stone was likely moved from its original location and then brought to the church. Before the historic significance of runestones was understood, they were often reused as materials in the construction of churches, walls, and roads.

=== Inscription ===
==== Transliteration of runic text into Latin letters ====
ika × let × kiara × bro × ok × staina rita eftiʀ × rahna × s(u)(n) × sin × ok × rahniltr × eftir × boanta × sin × stain ' r[isti]

==== Transcription into Old Norse ====
Inga let gæra bro ok stæina retta æftiʀ Ragna, sun sinn, ok Ragnhildr æftiʀ boanda sinn. Stæinn risti.

==== Translation in English ====
Inga had the bridge made and the stones erected in memory of Ragni, her son; and Ragnhildr in memory of her husbandman. Steinn carved.

== See also ==
- List of runestones
