= Böksta Runestone =

Viking Age runestone in Sweden

Coordinates: 59.7706°N 17.4097°E

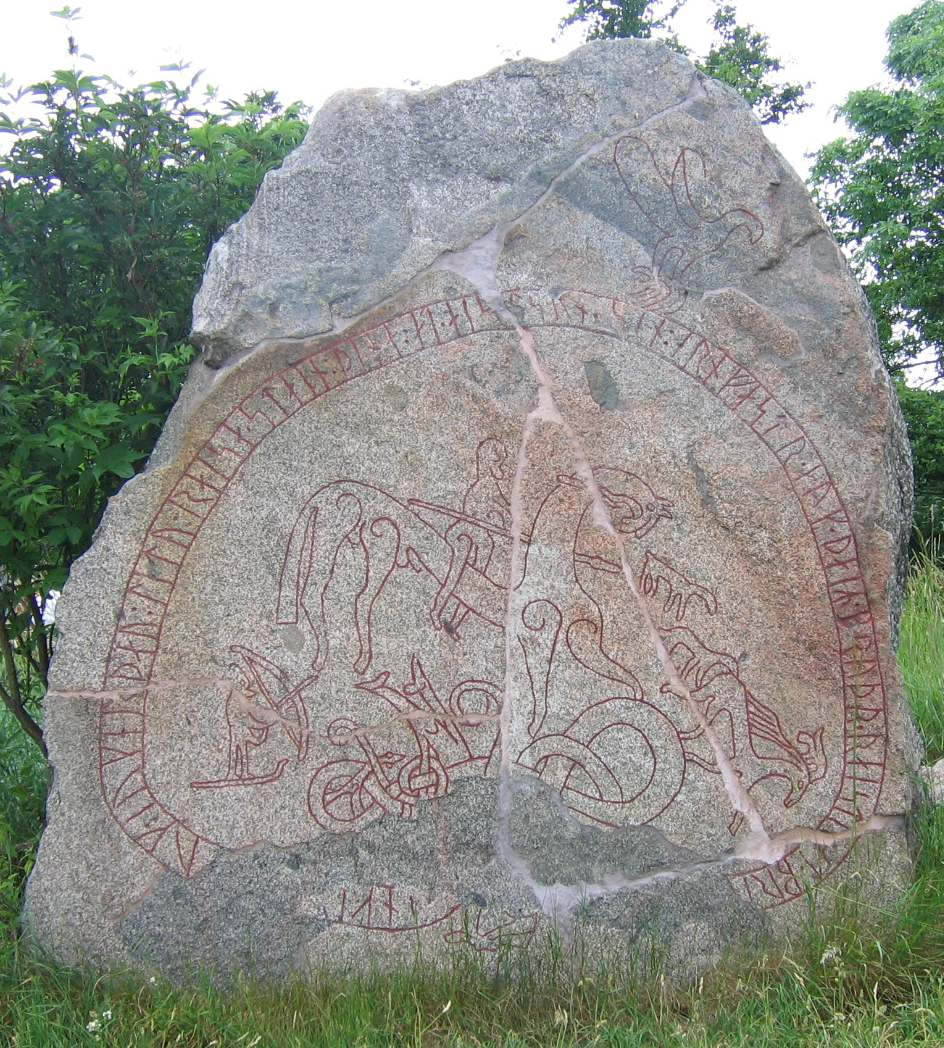
- Created: 11th Century
- Discovered: Balingsta, Uppland, Sweden
- Rundata ID: U 855
- Runemaster: Unknown

Location of the Böksta Runestone in Sweden

The Böksta runestone is a Viking Age memorial runestone that is located near the farm of Böksta in Balingsta, which is about four kilometers southwest of Ramstalund, Uppsala County, Sweden, in the historic province of Uppland. It is situated not far from Balingsta Church.

== Description ==
The Böksta Runestone, which is made of granite and is 2.6 meters in height, is notable for its images of a man on horseback holding a spear who is hunting an animal that may be an elk (moose) with two dogs and two birds. One of the birds is attacking the eyes of the hunted animal, which is consistent with past practices when hunting with birds. Finds from graves indicate that falconry has been practiced in Sweden since the 6th century.

Observing the hunter is another man on skis, holding a bow and arrow. Surrounding the hunting scene is the runic text inscribed within a serpent. The inscription is believed to date from approximately 1050 CE and is tentatively classified as being carved in runestone style Pr2, which is also known as Ringerike style. The runestone, which was originally located at Prästgården, was broken into several sections with a central section missing since the 1600s. This section was found near the gate to the church at Prästgården, and the runestone disassembled and rebuilt using the newly found section in 2004.

The man carrying a bow and on skis is typically identified as Ullr, who in Chapter 21 of Skáldskaparmál of the Prose Edda is described as a Norse pagan ski-god, archery-god, and hunting-god. It has also been suggested that the man on horseback, who has a beard and helmet and is riding a stallion, is the god Odin with his spear Gungnir on his horse Sleipnir. In this case, Sleipnir would be depicted with only four legs instead of the more common eight legs, however, a four-legged depiction of this horse was also used on the Tängelgårda stone. The two dogs or wolves would then be Geri and Freki and the birds the ravens Huginn and Muninn.

Several other Scandinavian runestones include depictions of horses, including DR 96 in Ålum, N 61 in Alstad, Sö 101 in Ramsundsberget, Sö 226 in Norra Stutby, Sö 239 in Häringe, Sö 327 in Göksten, U 375 in Vidbo, U 488 in Harg, U 599 in Hanunda, U 691 in Söderby, U 901 in Håmö, U 935 at the Uppsala Cathedral, and U 1003 in Frötuna.

== Inscription ==
inki[...] [a]uk : iuker [:] þau : litu : raisa * stain : þina : a[t] * ais[t *] sun * sin : ernfastr * auk * þaiʀ * (b)ryþr * raist[u] * at * bru[...]
Ingi... ok {} Iogærðr {} þau {} letu {} ræisa {} stæin {} þenna {} at {} Æist, {} sun {} sinn, {} Ærnfastr {} ok {} þæiʀ {} brøðr {} ræistu {} at {} {bro[ður sinn].}
Ingi-... and Jógerðr, they had this stone raised in memory of Eistr, their son; Ernfastr and his brothers raised in memory of their brother.

== See also ==
- List of runestones
