= Uppland Runic Inscription 448 =

Coordinates: 59°40′51″N 17°51′54″E

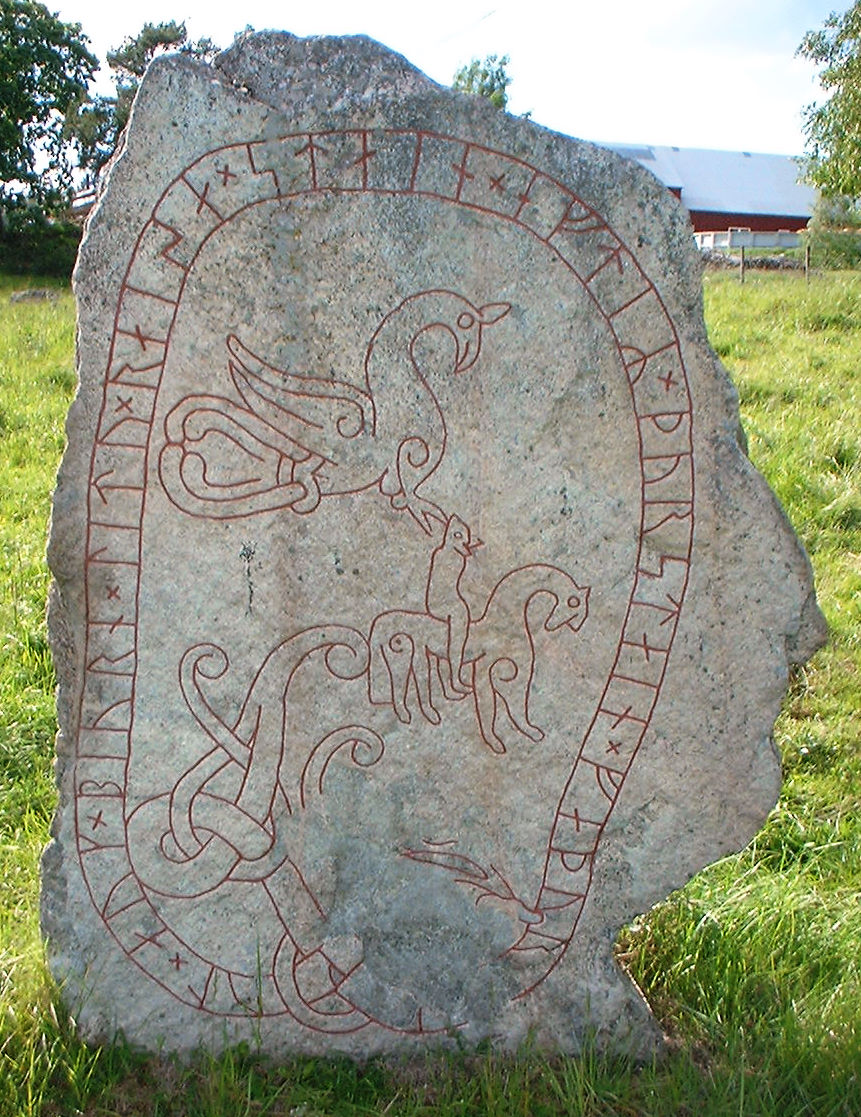
Runestone U 448 is located in Harg, Uppland, Sweden.

This runic inscription, designated as U 448 in the Rundata catalog, is on a Viking Age memorial runestone located in Harg, which is about 4 kilometers north of Märsta, Stockholm County, Sweden, which was in the historic province of Uppland.

== Description ==
The design of this inscription consists of runic text inscribed within a serpent band, which circles the stylized figures of a man on a horse and of a bird. The stone is composed of granite and is 1.9 meters in height. The inscription is tentatively classified as being carved in runestone style Pr3, which is also known as Urnes style. This runestone style is characterized by slim and stylized animals that are interwoven into tight patterns. The animal heads on Pr3 inscriptions are typically seen in profile with slender almond-shaped eyes and upwardly curled appendages on the noses and the necks. Based on stylistic analysis, the inscription has been attributed to the Swedish runemaster Fot, who was active in Sweden in the mid-eleventh century. Fot was noted for the consistency of his use of the punctuation mark × between the words in the runic inscription, which is evident in the runic text of this inscription.

The runic text states that the stone was raised by Ígull and Bjǫrn as a memorial to their father Þorsteinn. The name Þorsteinn contains as a theophoric name element the Norse pagan god Thor, and means "Thor's Stone." One word of the runic text, sinn, has been implied based upon similar inscriptions on memorial stones for a portion of the text that was damaged and lost.

The inscription includes a depiction of a bird and a figure on a horse. The bird in the upper center of the inscription has been identified, due to its tail, as possibly being a peacock, which in the early Catholic Church was used as a symbol of rebirth and resurrection. Alternatively, the bird may also be a forest bird such as a black grouse or capercaillie. Other Scandinavian runestones that include depictions of horses include DR 96 in Ålum, N 61 in Alstad, Sö 101 in Ramsundsberget, Sö 226 in Norra Stutby, Sö 239 in Häringe, Sö 327 in Göksten, U 375 in Vidbo, U 599 in Hanunda, U 691 in Söderby, U 855 in Böksta, U 901 in Håmö, U 935 at the Uppsala Cathedral, and U 1003 in Frötuna.

== Inscription ==
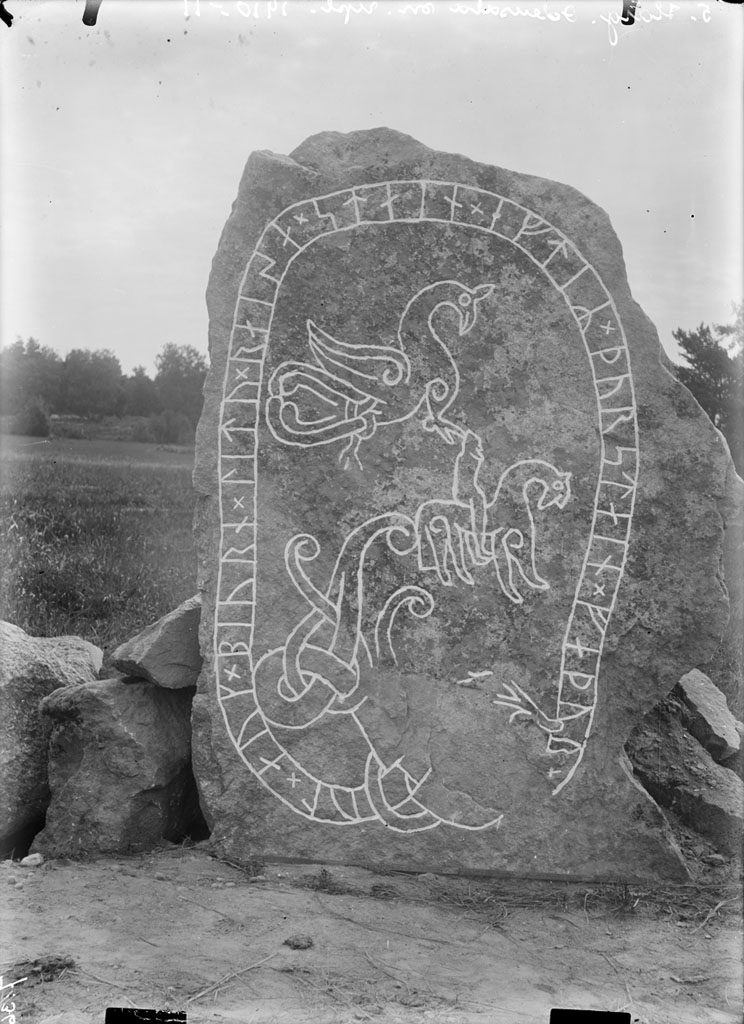
The runestone as it appeared in 1910–11

=== Runic text ===
_ᚴᚢᛚ᛫ᛅᚢᚴ᛫ᛒᛁᚢᚱᚾ᛫ᛚᛁᛏᚢ᛫ᚱᛅᛁᛋᛅ᛫ᛋᛏᛅᛁᚾ᛫ᛂᚠᛏᛁᛦ᛫ᚦᚢᚱᛋᛏᛅᛁᚾ᛫ᚠᛅᚦᚢᚱ____

=== Transliteration of the runes into Latin characters ===
(i)kul × auk × biurn × litu × raisa × stain × eftiʀ × þurstain × faþur ...

=== Transcription into Old Norse ===
Ígull ok Bjǫrn létu reisa stein eptir Þorstein, fǫður [sinn].

=== Translation in English ===
Ígull and Bjǫrn had the stone raised in memory of Þorsteinn, their father.

== See also ==
- Christian symbolism
- List of runestones
