= Heby Municipality =

Heby Municipality Heby kommun
- Municipality
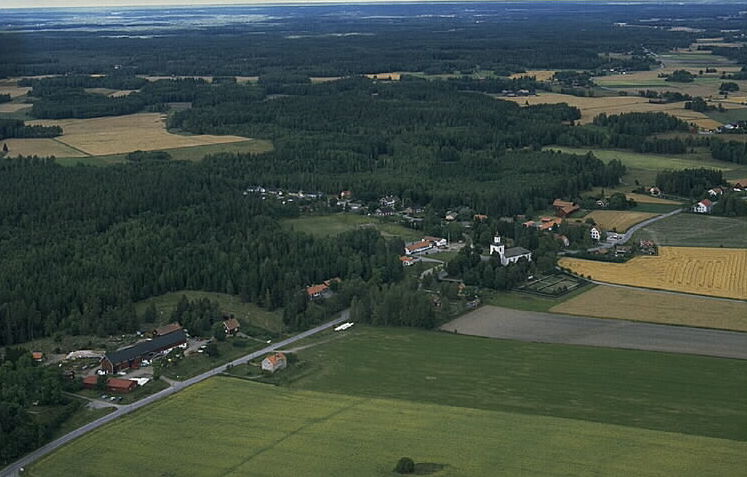

- Coat of arms

- Coordinates: 59°56′N 16°53′E
- Country: Sweden
- County: Uppsala County
- Seat: Heby

Area
  - Total: 1,225.6 km^{2} (473.2 sq mi)
  - Land: 1,166.81 km^{2} (450.51 sq mi)
  - Water: 58.79 km^{2} (22.70 sq mi)
- Area as of 1 January 2014.

Population (30 June 2025)
  - Total: 14,290
  - Density: 12.25/km^{2} (31.72/sq mi)
- Time zone: UTC+1 (CET)
  - Summer (DST): UTC+2 (CEST)
- ISO 3166 code: SE
- Province: Uppland
- Municipal code: 0331
- Website: www.heby.se

Heby Municipality (Swedish: Heby kommun) is a municipality in Uppsala County in east central Sweden. Its seat is located in the town of Heby.

The first municipality with the name Heby was created in 1952, during the first of the two nationwide municipal reforms in Sweden, through the amalgamation of three original units in Västmanland County. The name was taken from the settlement Heby, which had been a municipalsamhälle (a kind of borough) since 1887. In 1971 three more former entities were added.

== Geography ==
The Dalälven River forms Heby's northern border. The municipality also has substantial forests with animals such as elk, deer, fox, bear and lynx.

=== Localities ===
- Harbo
- Heby (seat)
- Huggle
- Morgongåva
- Runhällen
- Tärnsjö
- Vittinge
- Östervåla

== Demographics ==
This is a demographic table based on Heby Municipality's electoral districts in the 2022 Swedish general election sourced from SVT's election platform, in turn taken from SCB official statistics.

In total there were 14,282 residents, including 10,903 Swedish citizens of voting age. 43.3% voted for the left coalition and 55.0% for the right coalition. Indicators are in percentage points except population totals and income.

Location	Residents	Citizen adults	Left vote	Right vote	Employed	Swedish parents	Foreign heritage	Income SEK	Degree
Location			%	%					
Harbo	1,707	1,323	39.0	59.4	82	88	12	24,564	27
Morgongåva	2,707	1,995	46.0	52.6	78	78	22	23,655	32
Tärnsjö	2,135	1,658	42.4	55.8	76	86	14	21,820	18
Västerlövsta V	2,486	1,868	47.3	50.9	79	79	21	23,875	31
Västerlövsta Ö	2,266	1,759	41.7	56.8	83	86	14	24,335	27
Östervåla	2,981	2,300	42.6	55.9	81	90	10	23,110	21
Source: SVT

== Notability ==
Heby used to be part of Västmanland County, which borders Uppsala County to the west. In September 2005 it was reported that the municipality was permitted to be part of Uppsala County after intense lobbying in the late 1990s, following a municipal poll in 1998 where the majority was in support of the county transition. The transition took place on January 1, 2007. There were, however, forces who worked for the transition not to take place.

== See also ==
- Gårdsjö Älgpark
