= Anna Alm =

Swedish editor and author

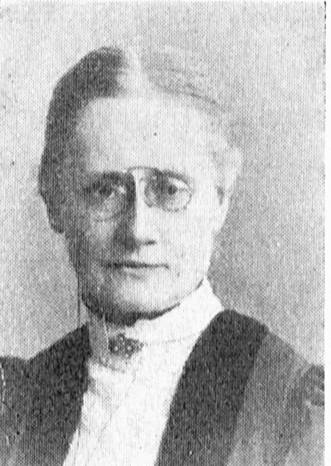
- Portrait of the author
- Born: 27 May 1862; Harbo, Västmanland, Sweden
- Died: 19 October 1958 (aged 96); Stockholm, Sweden
- Occupation(s): editor and author

Anna Vilhelmina Alm (27 May 1862 – 19 October 1958) was a Swedish editor and author. Alm wrote several books and edited an independent Church of Sweden parish journal, Församlingsbladet.

== Biography ==
Born in 1862 to Captain Olof Wilhelm Forssell and Jacquette Euphrosyne Cecilia Neijber in Harbo, Västmanland County, and married in 1886 to Carl Alm (a roteman, or person responsible for population registration in parishes in Stockholm), in 1905 Anna Alm became the editor of the publication Församlingsbladet. Församlingsbladet was run by the Church organisation Sällskapet för främjande av kyrklig själavård (The Society for the Promotion of Church Mental Health), an organisation that was started by Carl Alm and later merged with the Church of Sweden lay association. The newspaper began as an insert for the Swedish newspaper Vårt Land but in 1904 became an independent publication, and dealt mostly with parish affairs. She remained in this position until 1918.

Alm wrote a number of books including En bok för mor (A book for mother, 1909), Boken om söndagarna (The book on Sundays, 1913), En gammal medeltidssaga för unga riddare (An old medieval tale for young knights, 1917), På storstadens gränsmarker (On the city limits of the big city, 1918), I Torstuna prästgård (In Torstuna vicarage, 1926), and Från år som flytt (From years that moved, 1929).

Anna and Carl Alm are buried together at the Norra begravningsplatsen in Stockholm.
