= Södermanland Runic Inscription 226 =

Coordinates: 59°05′03″N 17°48′48″E

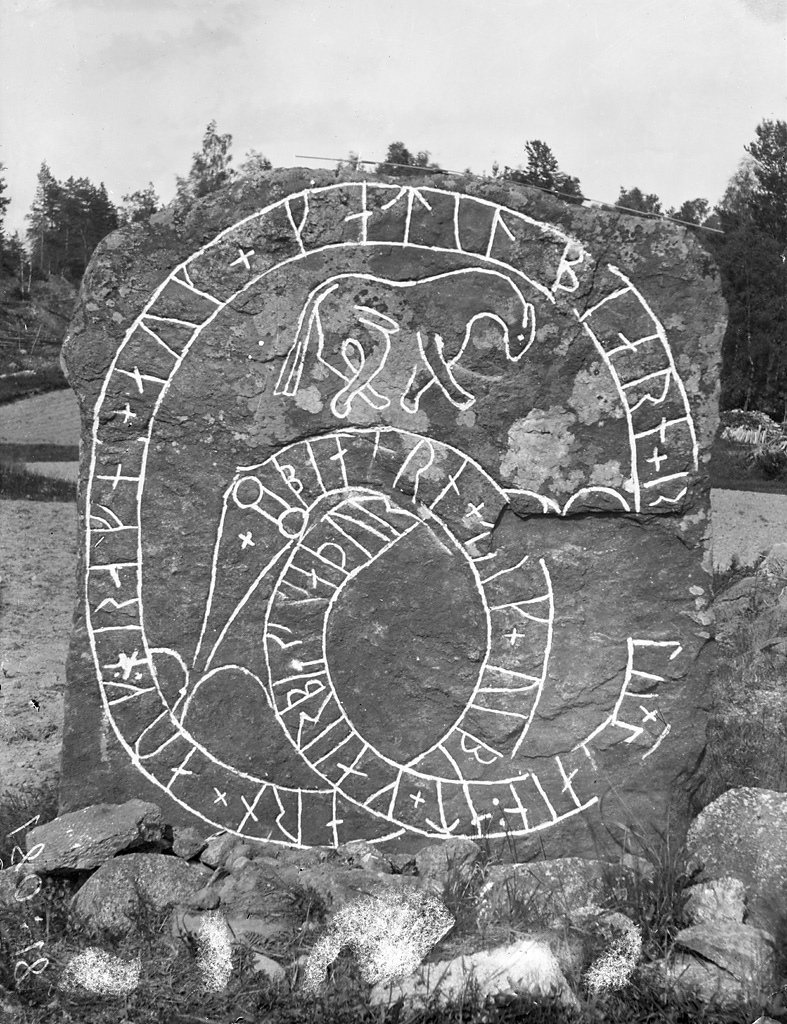
Photograph of Sö 226 in 1900.

Södermanland Runic Inscription 226 or Sö 226 is the Rundata catalog listing for a Viking Age memorial runestone located in Norra Stutby, which is about eight kilometers north of Sorunda, Stockholm County, Sweden, which was in the historic province of Södermanland.

== Description ==
The inscription on Sö 226 consists of runic text in the younger futhark that is carved on a serpent that circles along the outline of the stone, which is about 1.8 meters in height. A figure of a horse is in inside the serpent at the top of the stone. The horse, which is clearly a stallion as indicated by the phallus, is depicted with crossed legs to indicate powerlessness. The combination of symbols of fertility and powerlessness on the horse may indicate regeneration or salvation. Several other Scandinavian runestones include depictions of horses, including DR 96 in Ålum, N 61 in Alstad, Sö 101 in Ramsundsberget, Sö 239 in Häringe, Sö 327 in Göksten, U 375 in Vidbo, U 488 in Harg, U 599 in Hanunda, U 691 in Söderby, U 855 in Böksta, U 901 in Håmö, U 935 at the Uppsala Cathedral, and U 1003 in Frötuna. The inscription on Sö 226 is classified as being carved in runestone style Fp, which is the classification for runic text bands with attached serpent or beast heads that are depicted as seen from above. The inscription based on stylistic analysis is attributed to a runemaster named Amunde, who signed inscriptions on the now-lost Sö 215 in Sorunda, Sö 223 in Trollsta, Sö 268 in Söderby, and the now-lost Sö 271 in Täckeråker.

The runic text states that the stone was raised by four men named Bjôrn, Vébjôrn, Hrafni, and Ketilbjôrn in memory of their father Geirbjôrn. The names of three of the brothers share the common name element bjôrn, which is Old Norse for "bear," with their father. A common practice at that time in Scandinavia was the repeating one of the name elements from a parent's name in the names of the children to show the family connection. The missing portion of the damaged runic text was reconstructed as the words ræistu stæin or "raised the stone" based upon similar wording on other inscriptions.

== Inscription ==
=== Transliteration of the runes into Latin characters ===
+ biairn + auk + uibiarn × auk: hrafni + auk + ketilbiarn + r---(t)(u) × (s)[t]ain: at + kairbirn faþur

=== Transcription into Old Norse ===
Biarn ok Vibiarn ok Hrafni ok Kætilbiarn r[æis]tu stæin at Gæiʀbiarn, faður [sinn].

=== Translation in English ===
Bjôrn and Vébjôrn and Hrafni and Ketilbjôrn raised the stone in memory of Geirbjôrn, their father.
