= Huggle =

Huggle may refer to:

- Huggle, Sweden, a very small medieval village in Heby, Uppsala, Sweden
- Huggle (app)
- Mr. Huggles, a W.I.T.C.H character
- Bunny Huggles, a Hi Hi Puffy AmiYumi character
- The Huggles, a character on The Great Space Coaster
