= Gårdsjö Älgpark =

- Moose at the park in 2014
- Interactive map of Gårdsjö Älgpark
- 59.962582°N 16.96959°E
- Date opened: 2007 (19 years ago)
- Location: Gårdsjö, Heby Municipality, Sweden
- No. of animals: 13 (as of 2023)
- Website: gardsjoalgpark.se

Gårdsjö Älgpark (English: Gårdsjö Moose Park) is a wildlife park in Gårdsjö, Heby Municipality, Sweden. Founded in 2007 by Leif "Leffe" Lindh and his wife, Ilona Carlengård, it is located on farmland which has been in Lindh's family for three generations. Lindh became interested in moose after rescuing one that was hit by a vehicle, although the animal ultimately died.

The park began with two moose inside 16 hectares (40 acres) of land. By 2023, there were thirteen moose across 25 hectares (62 acres).

In 2017, Lindh and Carlengård had a moose calf named Olivia living in their home for four months, having been rejected by its mother. In March 2018, a video of the calf eating tulips went viral on Facebook, with over 4 million views.

The park is open between May and December, to allow for rutting season.
