= Balingsta Church =

Church building in Uppsala Municipality, Sweden

Coordinates: 59°45′49″N 17°25′31″E

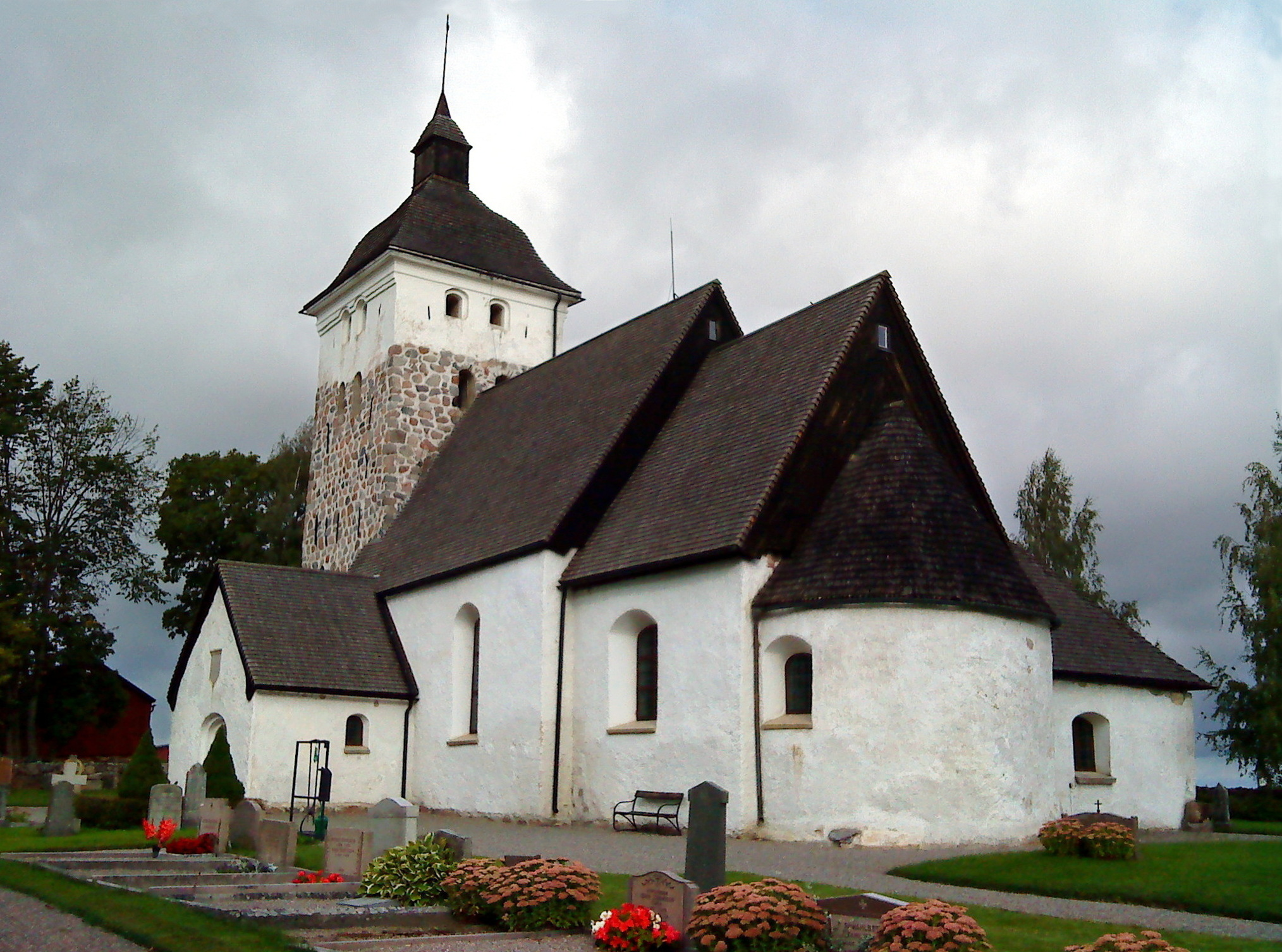
Balingsta Church (2009)

Balingsta Church (Swedish: Balingsta kyrka) is a Lutheran church in the Archdiocese of Uppsala in Uppsala County, Sweden. It is one of the best preserved Romanesque churches in the province of Uppland.

Not far from the church is the site of the Viking Age memorial Böksta Runestone (Bökstastenen).

== History and architecture ==
The oldest parts of Balingsta Church, the nave, choir and apse, date from the end of the 12th century. A few years later the tower was added to the church. The vestry was built in the 15th century, and during the same century the church ceiling was remade into a vaulted ceiling, decorated with frescos, of which only fragments remain. In the 16th century the church tower was heightened and a church porch added. The church was again rebuilt in the 18th century, when new and larger windows were inserted and the presently visible lantern was added to the tower. The church has remained more or less unchanged since.

During the 19th century, the church was in a state of decay and in 1872 the congregation moved out of the church into a new church not far away. The medieval church was left abandoned. However, already in 1917 the congregation decided to restore the old church and move back; substantial restoration works were carried out under the leadership of architect Sigurd Curman (1879-1966) and the congregation moved back in 1919. In 1934, the 19th-century church was pulled down.

The church is built of partly whitewashed fieldstone. It is a hall church ending in a choir with an apse. On the south façade the church porch protrudes and on the north, the vestry. Inside, the church still has some iron chandeliers dating from the Middle Ages.
