= Tärnsjö =

- Location within Uppsala Location within Sweden
- Coordinates: 60°09′N 16°56′E
- Country: Sweden
- Province: Uppland
- County: Uppsala County
- Municipality: Heby Municipality

Area
  - Total: 1.89 km^{2} (0.73 sq mi)

Population (31 December 2020)
  - Total: 1,168
  - Density: 618/km^{2} (1,600/sq mi)
- Time zone: UTC+1 (CET)
  - Summer (DST): UTC+2 (CEST)

Tärnsjö is a locality situated in Heby Municipality, Uppsala County, Sweden, with 1,221 inhabitants in 2010.
