= Vittinge =

- Location within Uppsala Location within Sweden
- Coordinates: 59°54′N 17°04′E
- Country: Sweden
- Province: Uppland
- County: Uppsala County
- Municipality: Heby Municipality

Area
  - Total: 1.30 km^{2} (0.50 sq mi)

Population (31 December 2020)
  - Total: 601
  - Density: 462/km^{2} (1,200/sq mi)
- Time zone: UTC+1 (CET)
  - Summer (DST): UTC+2 (CEST)

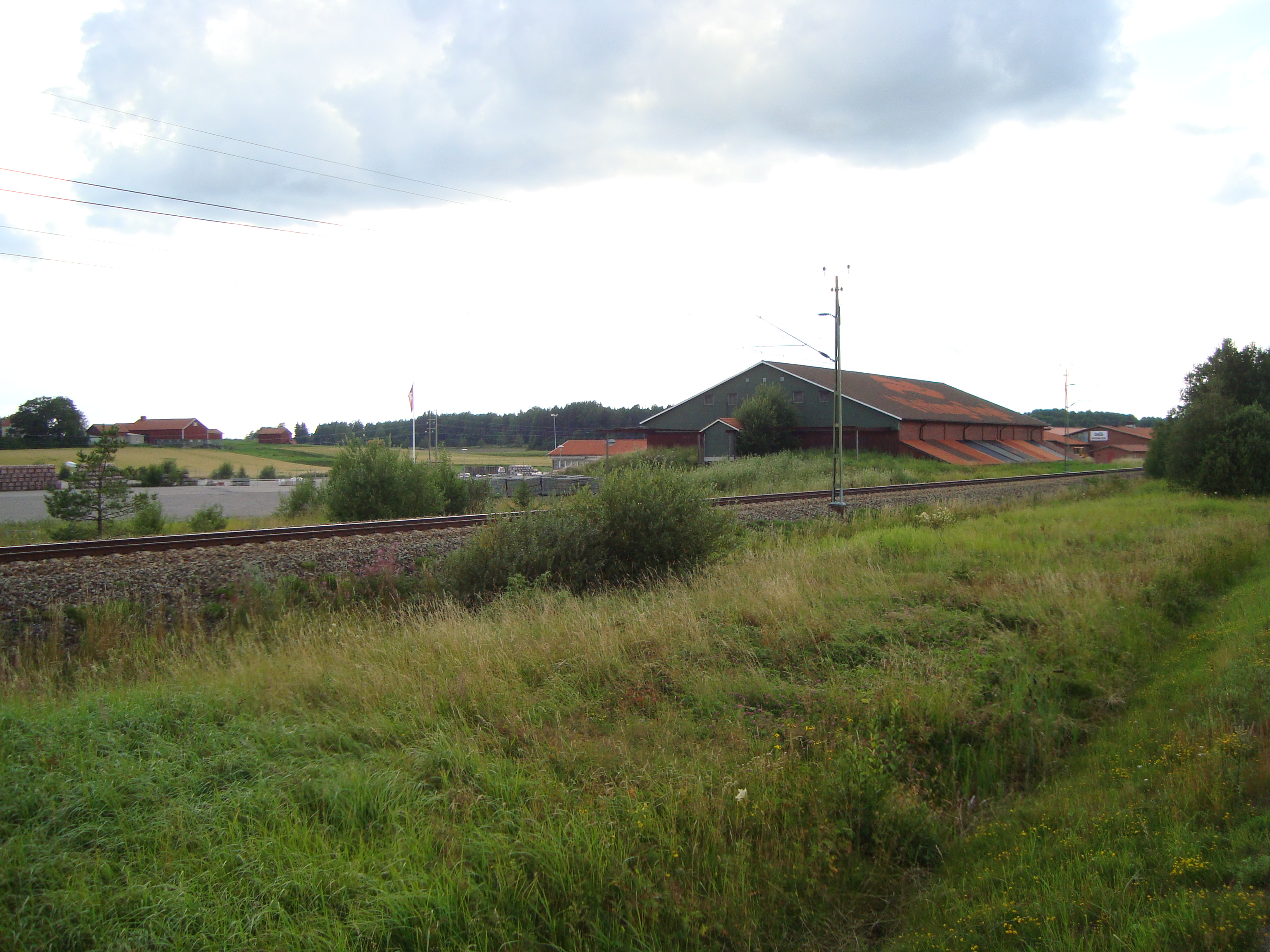

Vittinge is a locality situated in Heby Municipality, Uppsala County, Sweden with 460 inhabitants in 2010.
