= Adlibris =

Swedish online book retailer

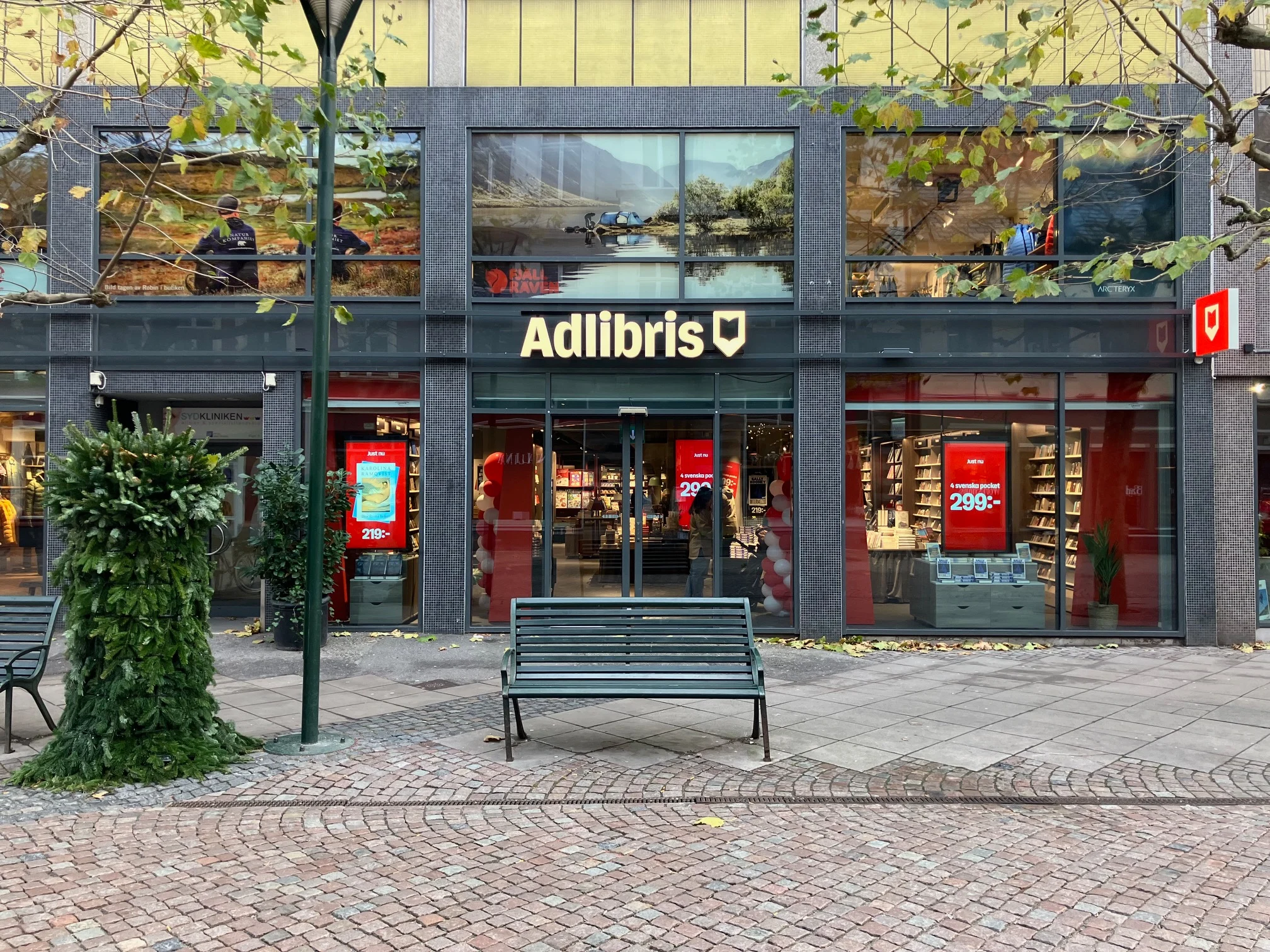
- Adlibris Store in Malmö, Sweden
- Company type: Aktiebolag
- Industry: Bookselling
- Number of employees: 485 (2021)
- Parent: Bonnier Group
- Website: adlibris.se

Adlibris Aktiebolag is a Swedish online bookstore established in 1997. The company has its headquarters in Stockholm, Sweden, and maintains a distribution center in Morgongåva. In 2005, Adlibris was acquired by the media conglomerate Bonnier Group. The company employed 485 people in 2021.

== Operations ==
Adlibris is active in Sweden, Finland and Norway and has ranked among the largest online stores for books in Sweden since the 1990s. Adlibris is also one of the main sellers of books to Swedish libraries. In addition to books, the company sells its own labels of yarn. It has acquired other retailers and conducts operations under a number of brands.

In 2017, the Adlibris Group employed more than 400 people and the revenue amounted to 155 million euro.

== Controversy ==
In 2017, Adlibris received widespread critique from customers following considerable delivery delays over the Christmas shopping period.

In 2021 Adlibris announced a new policy, requiring all publishers to contract a third-party distributor to continue selling books through their network. This policy was criticized in the press as well as by libraries who used Adlibris to purchase books, as the cost of an external distributor would be prohibitive for small publishers. Particular notice was made of publishers of literature in minority languages, such as the Sami languages. On August 5, 2021 Adlibris announced a retraction of the policy for existing publishers.
