= Runhällen =

- Location within Uppsala Location within Sweden
- Coordinates: 60°02′N 16°49′E
- Country: Sweden
- Province: Uppland
- County: Uppsala County
- Municipality: Heby Municipality

Area
  - Total: 0.50 km^{2} (0.19 sq mi)

Population (31 December 2010)
  - Total: 217
  - Density: 436/km^{2} (1,130/sq mi)
- Time zone: UTC+1 (CET)
  - Summer (DST): UTC+2 (CEST)

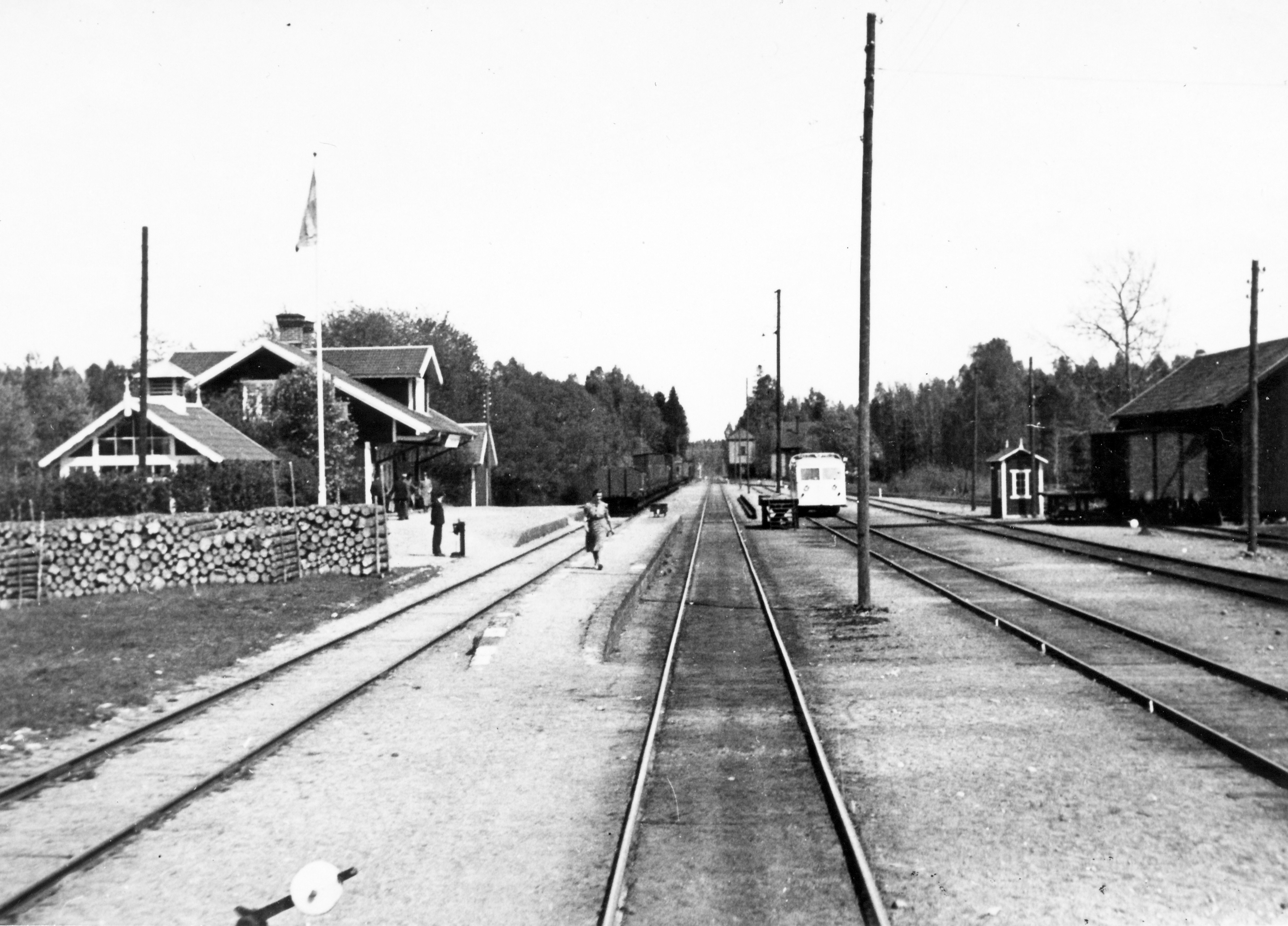
Runhällen railway station

Runhällen is a locality situated in Heby Municipality, Uppsala County, Sweden with 217 inhabitants in 2010.
