= Huggle, Sweden =

Village in Heby, Uppsala, Sweden

Coordinates: 60°10′N 17°13′E

Huggle is a rural village in Östervåla in Uppsala County, Sweden. The village is lacking in a land taxation list from 1312, but is mentioned in writing in 1454, so it is likely to have been founded during the late Middle Ages.
