= Östervåla =

Locality in Uppsala county, Sweden

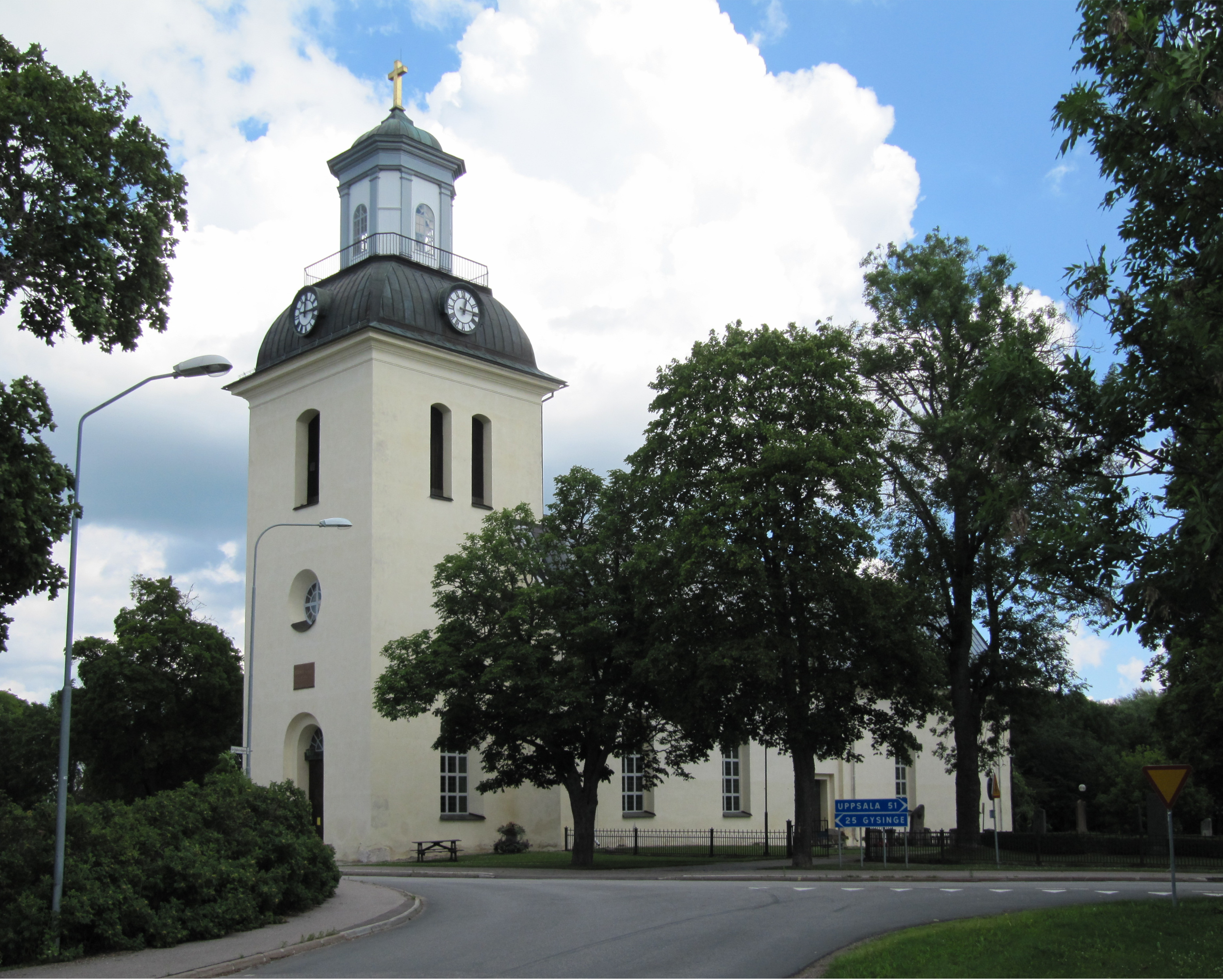
- Östervåla Church

- Location within Uppsala Location within Sweden
- Coordinates: 60°11′N 17°11′E
- Country: Sweden
- Province: Uppland
- County: Uppsala County
- Municipality: Heby Municipality

Area
  - Total: 1.83 km^{2} (0.71 sq mi)

Population (31 December 2020)
  - Total: 1,818
  - Density: 993/km^{2} (2,570/sq mi)
- Time zone: UTC+1 (CET)
  - Summer (DST): UTC+2 (CEST)

Östervåla is a locality situated in Heby Municipality, Uppsala County, Sweden with 1,595 inhabitants in 2010.
