= Morgongåva =

- Location within Uppsala Location within Sweden
- Coordinates: 59°56′N 16°57′E
- Country: Sweden
- Province: Uppland
- County: Uppsala County
- Municipality: Heby Municipality

Area
  - Total: 1.59 km^{2} (0.61 sq mi)

Population (31 December 2020)
  - Total: 1,476
  - Density: 928/km^{2} (2,400/sq mi)
- Time zone: UTC+1 (CET)
  - Summer (DST): UTC+2 (CEST)

Morgongåva is a locality situated in Heby Municipality, Uppsala County, Sweden with 1,409 inhabitants in 2010.

== Town name ==
The town name is the same as that of the oldest known name for a cottage (est. 1667) in the area. The cottage's name also contains the word "Morgongåva" (dower, literally "morning gift"). The reason why the cottage was called so is not entirely clear, but according to some, the name choice came about due to a love triangle. During the 17th century, the Patron of Molnebo, just outside Morgongåva, had an affair with one of his maids. She became pregnant and the Patron was afraid that his wife would find out about the relationship. He "bought" one of his farmhands who would provide for the maid and her future child. Once the maid servant and the farmhand were married, they received a cottage as a dower, or a "morning gift", hence the name. Quote from Heby Municipality: "Morgongåva is the extension of the name of a recent two-croft called so. The origin of the name is claimed to be a bride gift from a lord of the manor to one of his maids."

== History ==
During the construction of the Dala Railway Line in the 1870s, then part of the Northern Main Line, the German owners of Schisshytte-Molnebo AB proposed the construction of a railway station in Morgongåva. The station was not originally part of the plans for the line but ended up being built anyway due to the ironworks, which was under construction at the time. A small railway village with a regular street layout was planned and erected around the station, called Morgongåva. The ironworks Kung Oscarshyttan, modeled on the Silesian ironworks around Kattowitz, ended up an economic failure for various reasons and was never fully started up.

In 1898, the agricultural machine manufacturer Westerås Lantbruksmaskiner started manufacturing sowing machines and mowers here. The factory was closed in 1988 and later housed a discount department store.

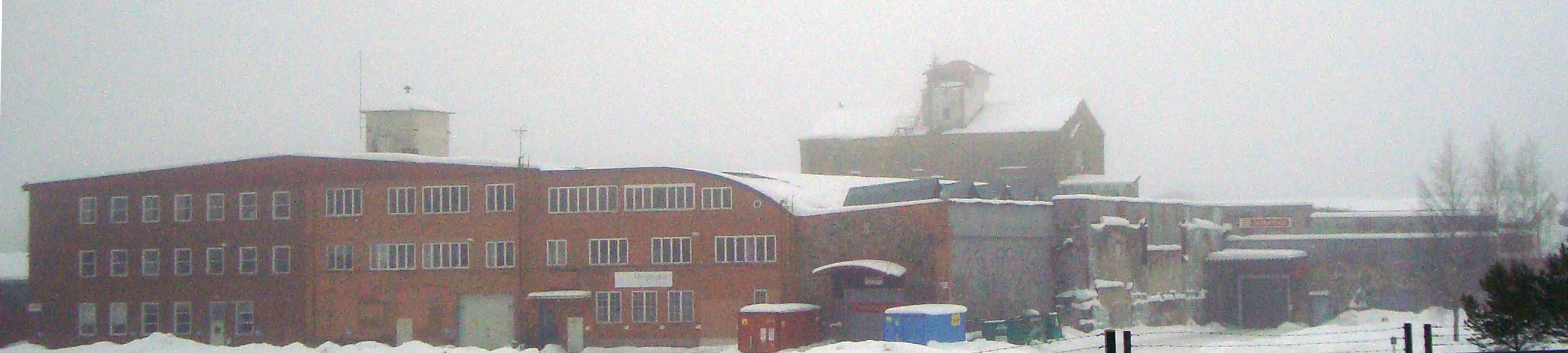
The Adlibris main distribution centre in 2010.

During the 21st century, Morgongåva has become a significant hub for Swedish E-commerce, being home to the main distribution centers for the online bookseller Adlibris with about 200 employees and the online pharmacy Apotea with over 500 employees.

== Transport ==
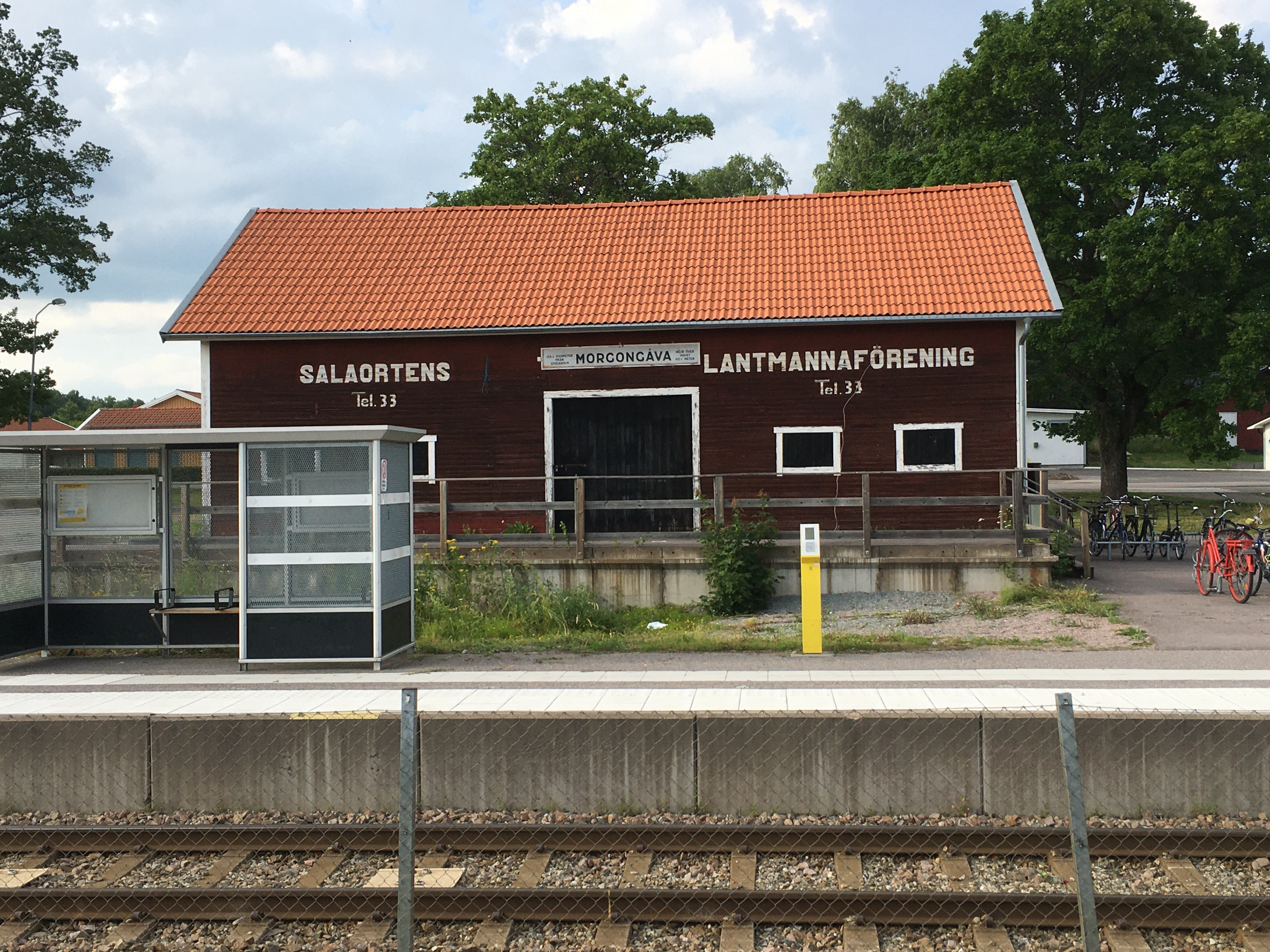
Morgongåva railway station in 2014.

Morgongåva is situated on Swedish national road 72. Morgongåva railway station on the Dala Line has hourly regional train connections to Sala, Heby and Uppsala. The regional bus route 848 between Sala and Uppsala also stops here.
