= Harbo =

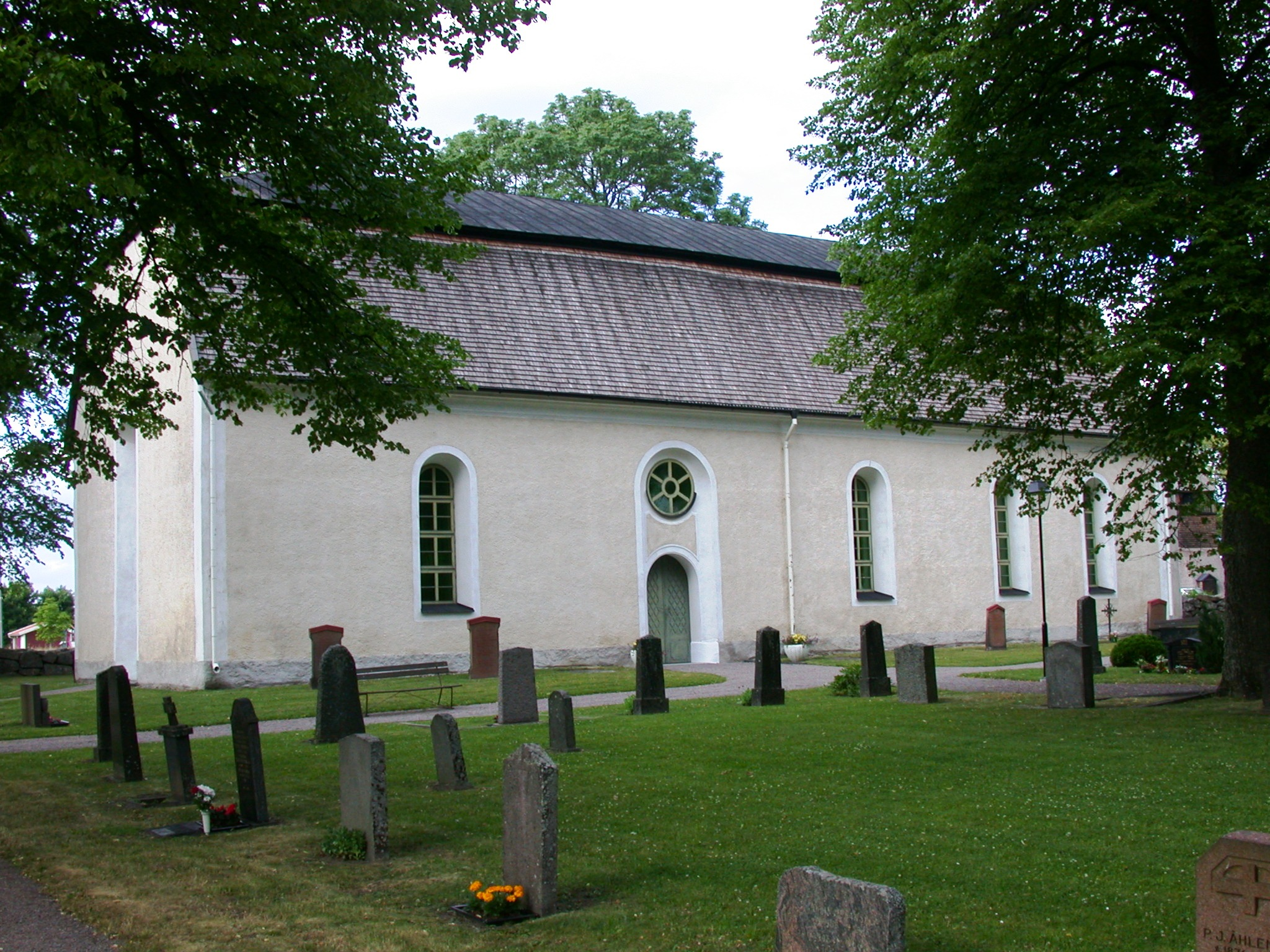
- Harbo Church

- Location within Uppsala Location within Sweden
- Coordinates: 60°06′N 17°12′E
- Country: Sweden
- Province: Uppland
- County: Uppsala County
- Municipality: Heby Municipality

Area
  - Total: 1.05 km^{2} (0.41 sq mi)

Population (31 December 2020)
  - Total: 816
  - Density: 777/km^{2} (2,010/sq mi)
- Time zone: UTC+1 (CET)
  - Summer (DST): UTC+2 (CEST)

Harbo is a locality situated in Heby Municipality, Uppsala County, Sweden with 721 inhabitants in 2010.
