= Sigurd stones =

Group of runic inscriptions in Sweden

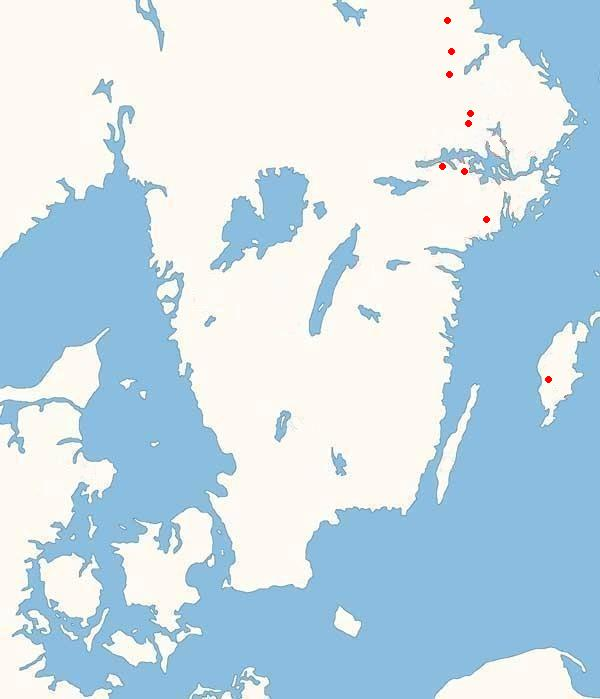
Geographic distribution of the Sigurd stones

The Sigurd stones form a group of eight or nine Swedish runic inscriptions (five or six runestones, two natural rocks, and a baptismal font) and one picture stone that depict imagery from the Germanic heroic legend of Sigurd the dragon slayer. They were made during the Viking Age and constitute the earliest Norse representations of the matter of the Völsung cycle that is the basis of the Middle High German Nibelungenlied and the Sigurd legends in the Poetic Edda, the Prose Edda, and the Völsunga saga.

In addition, the figure of Sigurd sucking the dragon's blood from his thumb appears on several carved stones in parts of Great Britain with strong Scandinavian cultural influence: at Ripon and Kirby Hill, North Yorkshire, at York and at Halton, Lancashire, and carved slates from the Isle of Man, broadly dated c. 950–1000, include several pieces interpreted as showing episodes from the Sigurd story.

Other depictions include wooden carvings from the Hylestad Stave Church.

== Uppland ==
=== U 1163 ===
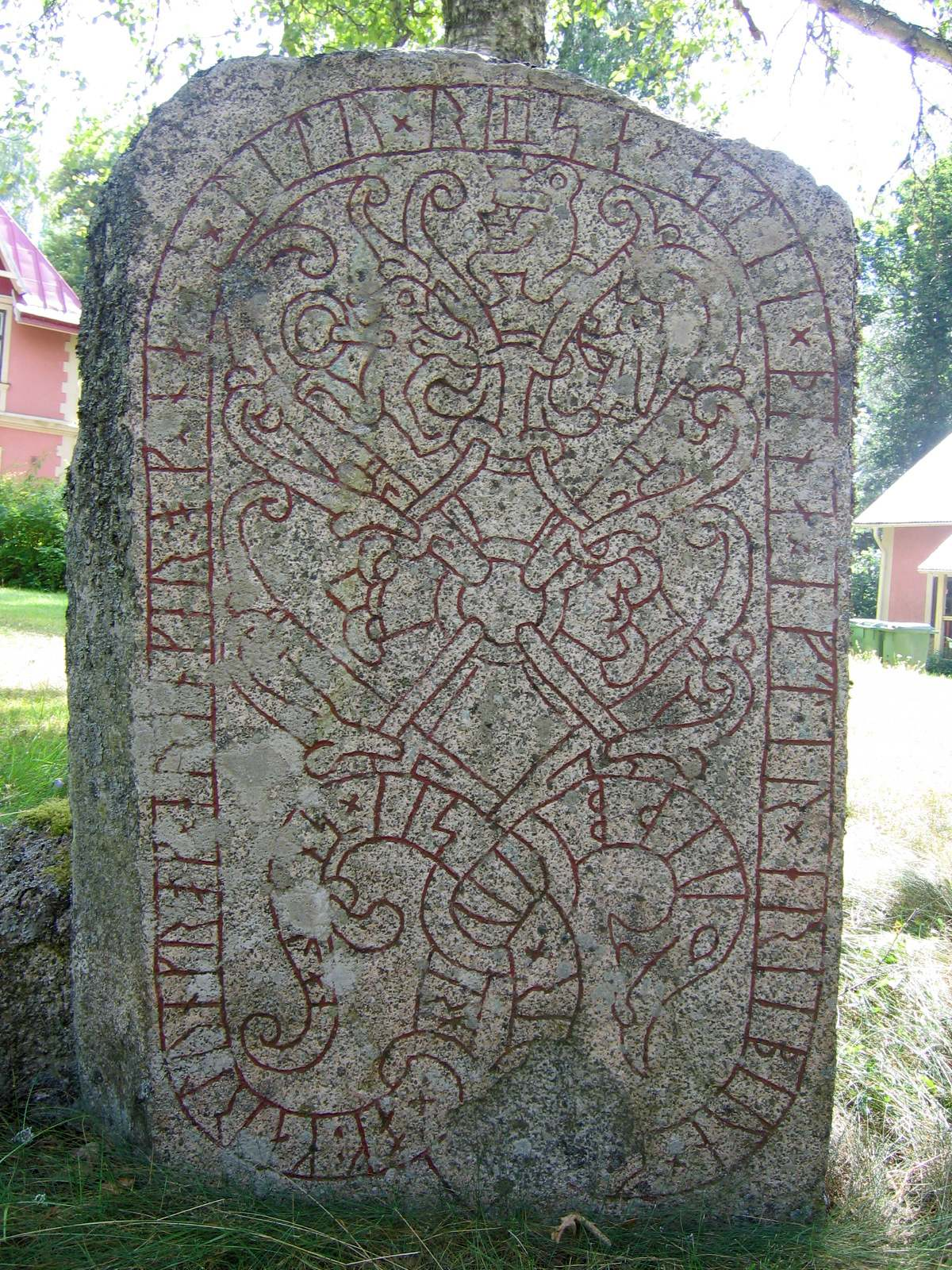
U 1163, the Drävle runestone

A reading of the Drävle stone's text in Old East Norse

This runestone is in runestone style Pr2. It was found in Drävle (ancient kingdom of Fjärdhundraland), but in 1878 it was moved to its current location in the courtyard of the nearby manor house of Revelsta, called Göksbo (ʻthe cuckooʼs nestʼ). Its imagery shows Sigurd thrusting his sword through the dragon Fafnir (the lindworm or serpent band containing the runic inscription), the dwarf Andvari, and the valkyrie Sigrdrífa offering a drinking horn to Sigurd.

The runestone has a stylized Christian cross, as do a number of other Sigurd stones: U 1175, Sö 327, Gs 2, and Gs 9. The combination of crosses with Sigurd images is taken as evidence of acceptance and use of legends from the Völsung cycle by Christianity during the transition period from Norse paganism.

Latin transliteration:

uiþbiurn × ok : karlunkr : ok × erinker : ok × nas(i) × litu × risa × stii × þina × eftir × eriibiun × f[aþu]r × sii × snelan

Old Norse transcription:

Viðbiorn ok Karlungʀ ok Æringæiʀʀ/Æringærðr ok Nasi/Næsi letu ræisa stæin þenna æftiʀ Ærinbiorn, faður sinn sniallan.

English translation:

"Viðbjǫrn and Karlungr and Eringeirr/Eringerðr and Nasi/Nesi had this stone raised in memory of Erinbjọrn, their able father."

=== U 1175 ===
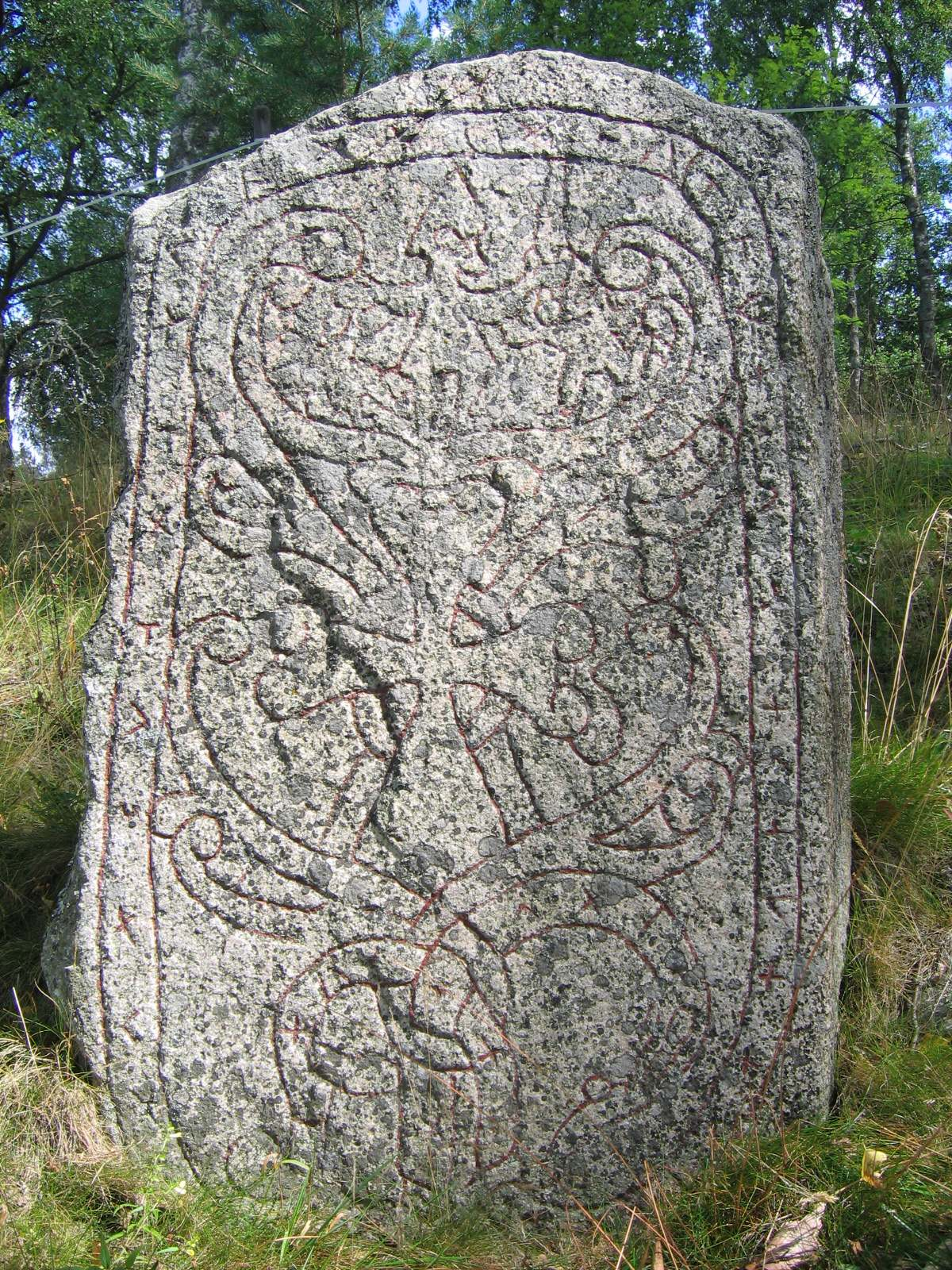
U 1175

This runestone is classified as being carved in runestone style Pr2 and is located in Stora Ramsjö, which is just southeast of Morgongåva. It belongs to the category of nonsensical runestones that do not contain any runes, only runelike signs surrounding a design with a cross. The inscription has the same motifs and ornamentation as U 1163 and may be a copy of that runestone.

== Södermanland ==
=== Sö 40, the Västerljung runestone ===
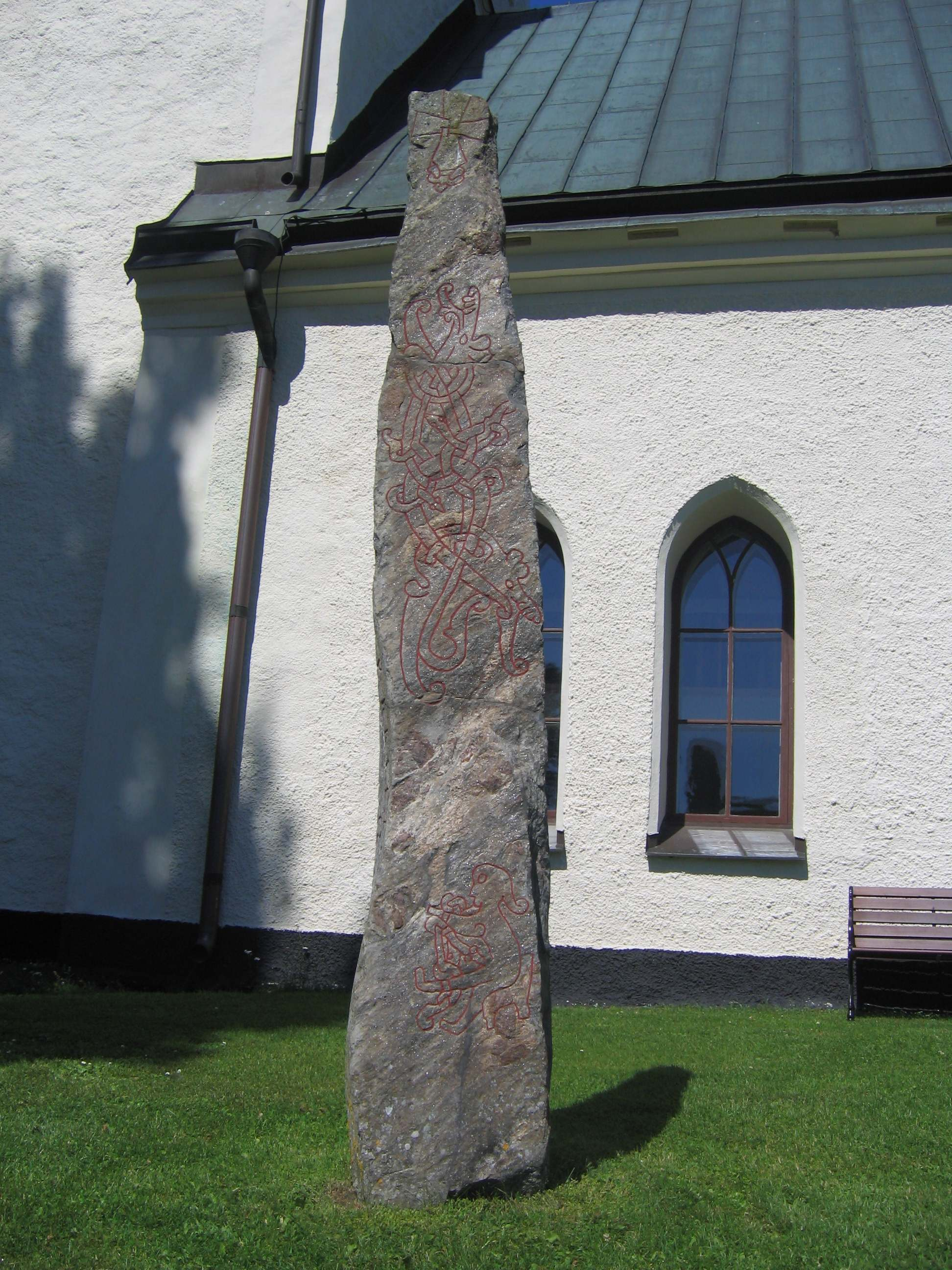
The image on the bottom of this side of the stone is held to depict Sigurd's brother-in-law Gunnar.

This runestone is located on the cemetery of the church of Västerljung, but it was discovered in 1959 in the foundation of the southwest corner of the church tower. The stone is 2.95 meters in height and is carved on three sides. One side has the runic text within a serpent band with the head and tail of the serpent bound at the bottom. The inscription is classified as being carved in runestone style Pr2 and the text states that it was made by the runemaster Skamhals. Another runestone, Sö 323, is signed by a Skamhals, but that is believed to be a different person with the same name. The other two sides contain images, with one interpreted as depicting Gunnar playing the harp in the snake pit.

Of the names in the inscription, Geirmarr means "spear-steed" and Skammhals is a nickname meaning "small neck".

Latin transliteration:

haunefʀ + raisti * at * kaiʀmar * faþur * sin + haa * iʀ intaþr * o * þiusti * skamals * hiak * runaʀ þaʀsi +

Old Norse transcription:

Honæfʀ ræisti at Gæiʀmar, faður sinn. Hann eʀ ændaðr a Þiusti. Skammhals hiogg runaʀ þaʀsi.

English translation:

"Hónefr raised (the stone) in memory of Geirmarr, his father. He met his end in Þjústr. Skammhals cut these runes."

=== Sö 101, the Ramsund carving ===
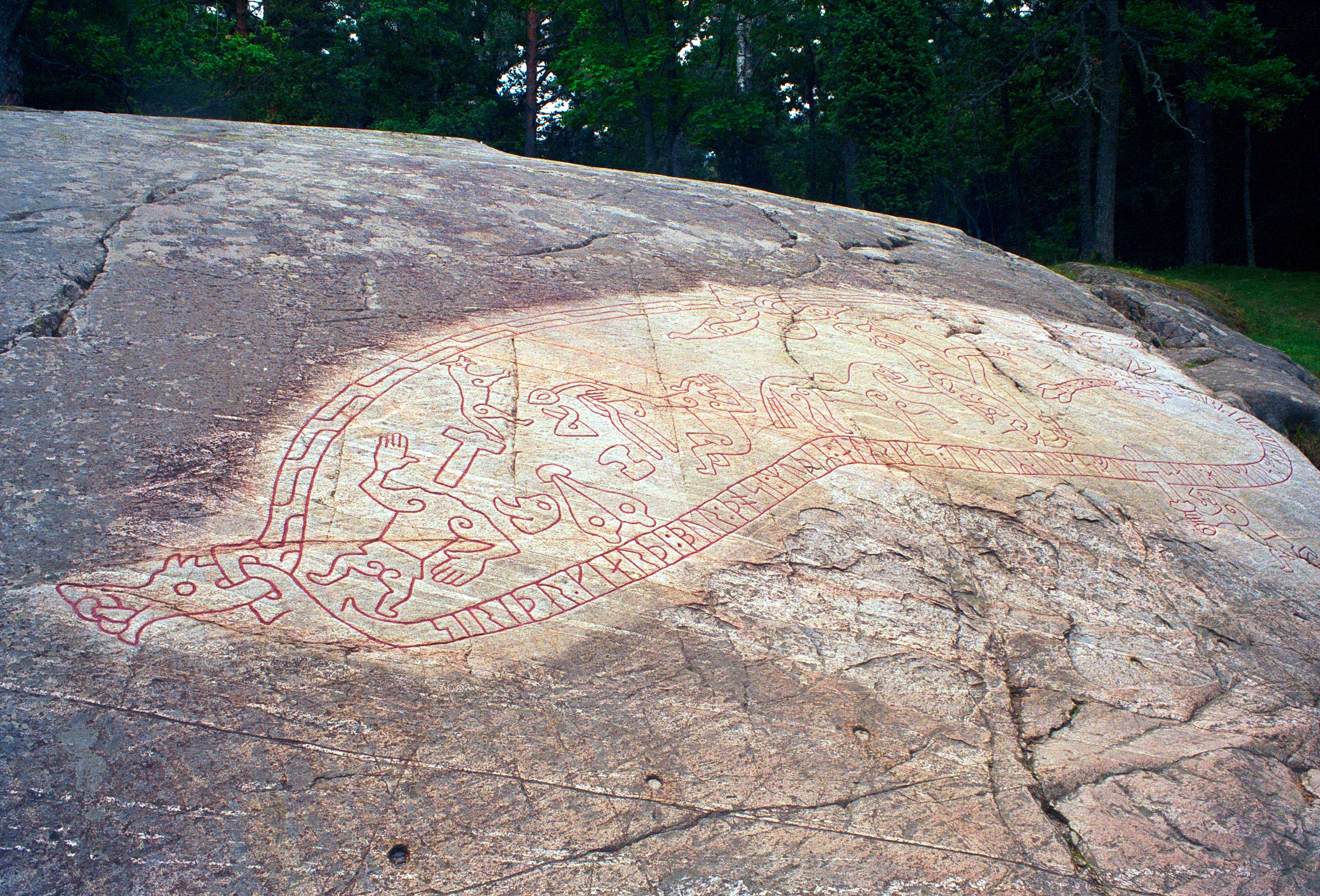
Sö 101

Drawing

A reading of the Ramsund carving's text in Old East Norse

The Ramsund carving is not quite a runestone as it is not carved into a stone, but into a flat rock close to Ramsund, Eskilstuna Municipality, Södermanland. It is believed to have been carved around the year 1030. It is generally considered an important piece of Norse art in runestone style Pr1.

The stone depicts (as numbered in the second image):

1. Sigurd sitting naked in front of the fire preparing the heart of the dragon Fafnir for his foster-father Regin, who is Fafnir's brother. The heart is not finished yet, and when Sigurd touches it, he burns himself and sticks his finger into his mouth. As he has tasted dragon blood, he starts to understand the birds' song.
2. The birds saying that Regin will not keep his promise of reconciliation and will try to kill Sigurd, which causes Sigurd to cut off Regin's head.
3. Regin lying dead beside his own head, his smithing tools with which he reforged Sigurd's sword Gram scattered around him
4. Sigurd's horse Grani laden with the dragon's treasure
5. Sigurd's previous killing of Fafnir
6. Regin's and Fafnir's brother Ótr from the saga's beginning

The inscription was made for the same aristocratic family as the nearby Bro Runestone and Kjula Runestone. The runic text is ambiguous, but one interpretation of the persons mentioned, based on those other inscriptions, is that Sigríðr is the widow of Sigrøðr, and Holmgeirr was her father-in-law. Alríkr, son of Sigríðr, erected another stone for his father, named Spjút, so while Alríkr is the son of Sigríðr, he was not the son of Sigrøðr. Alternatively, Holmgeirr is Sigríðr's second husband and Sigrøðr (but not Alríkr) is their son.

The inspiration for using the legend of Sigurd for the pictorial decoration was probably the close similarity of the names Sigurd (Sigurðr in Old Norse) and Sigrøðr. It has been also argued, that the name is a variant of the Old High German name Siegfried, and that Viking Age individuals would have understand that Siegfried was a variation of the name Sigurðr, given the commentary in the Poetic Edda

The reference to bridge-building in the runic text is fairly common in 11th-century runestones, including runic inscriptions U 489 and U 617. Some are Christian references related to passing the bridge into the afterlife, but the building of roads and bridges was also sponsored by the Catholic Church through the sale of indulgences promising intercession for the soul.

Latin transliteration:

siriþr : kiarþi : bur : þosi : muþiʀ : alriks : tutiʀ : urms : fur * salu : hulmkirs : faþur : sukruþar buata * sis *

Old Norse transcription:

Sigriðr gærði bro þasi, moðiʀ Alriks, dottiʀ Orms, for salu Holmgæiʀs, faður Sigrøðaʀ, boanda sins.

English translation:

"Sigríðr, Alríkr's mother, Ormr's daughter, made this bridge for the soul of Holmgeirr, father of Sigrøðr, her husbandman."

=== Sö 327, the Gök inscription ===
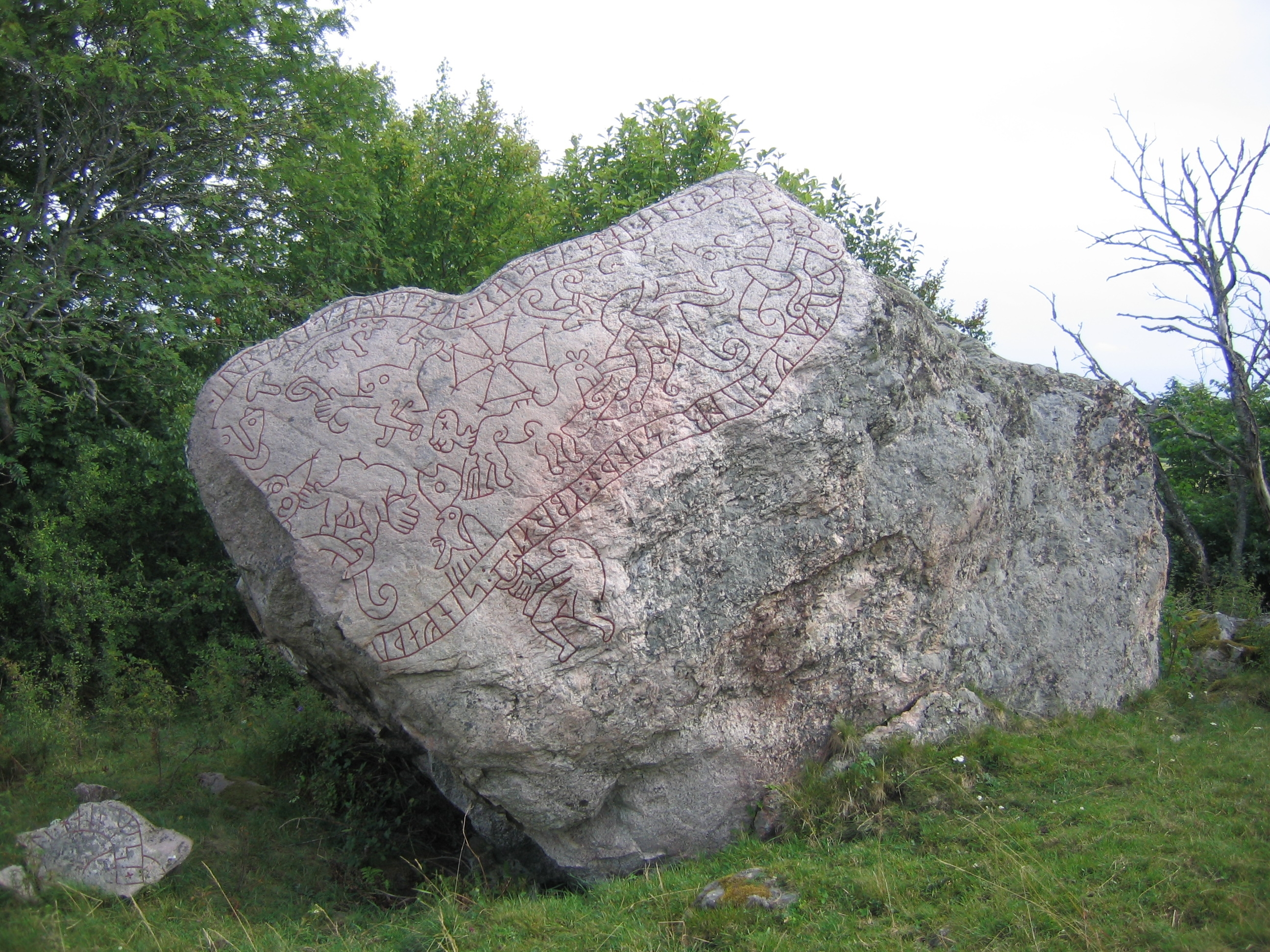
Sö 327 in 2007

This inscription, located at Gök, which is about 5 kilometers west of Strängnäs, is on a boulder and is classified as being carved in runestone style Pr1–Pr2. The inscription, which has a width of 2.5 meters and a height of 1.65 meters, consists of runic text on two serpents that surround much of the Sigurd imagery. The inscription dates from the same time as the Ramsund carving and it uses the same imagery, but a Christian cross has been added and the images are combined in a way that distorts the narrative logic. Some have claimed that the runemaster either did not understand the underlying myth, or consciously distorted its representation. Whatever the reason may have been, the Gök stone illustrates how the pagan heroic mythos was tending to dissolution during the Christianization of Scandinavia. However, the main figures from the story are represented in order when read from the right to the left. Sigurd is shown below the lower serpent, stabbing up at it with his sword. Other images include a tree, the horse Grani, a bird, the head of Regin and a headless body, the roasting of the dragon heart, and Ótr.

This inscription has never been satisfactorily transcribed nor translated.

Latin transliteration:

... (i)uraʀi : kaum : isaio : raisti : stai : ain : þansi : at : : þuaʀ : fauþr : sloþn : kbrat : sin faþu... ul(i) * hano : msi +

== Gästrikland ==
=== Gs 2 ===
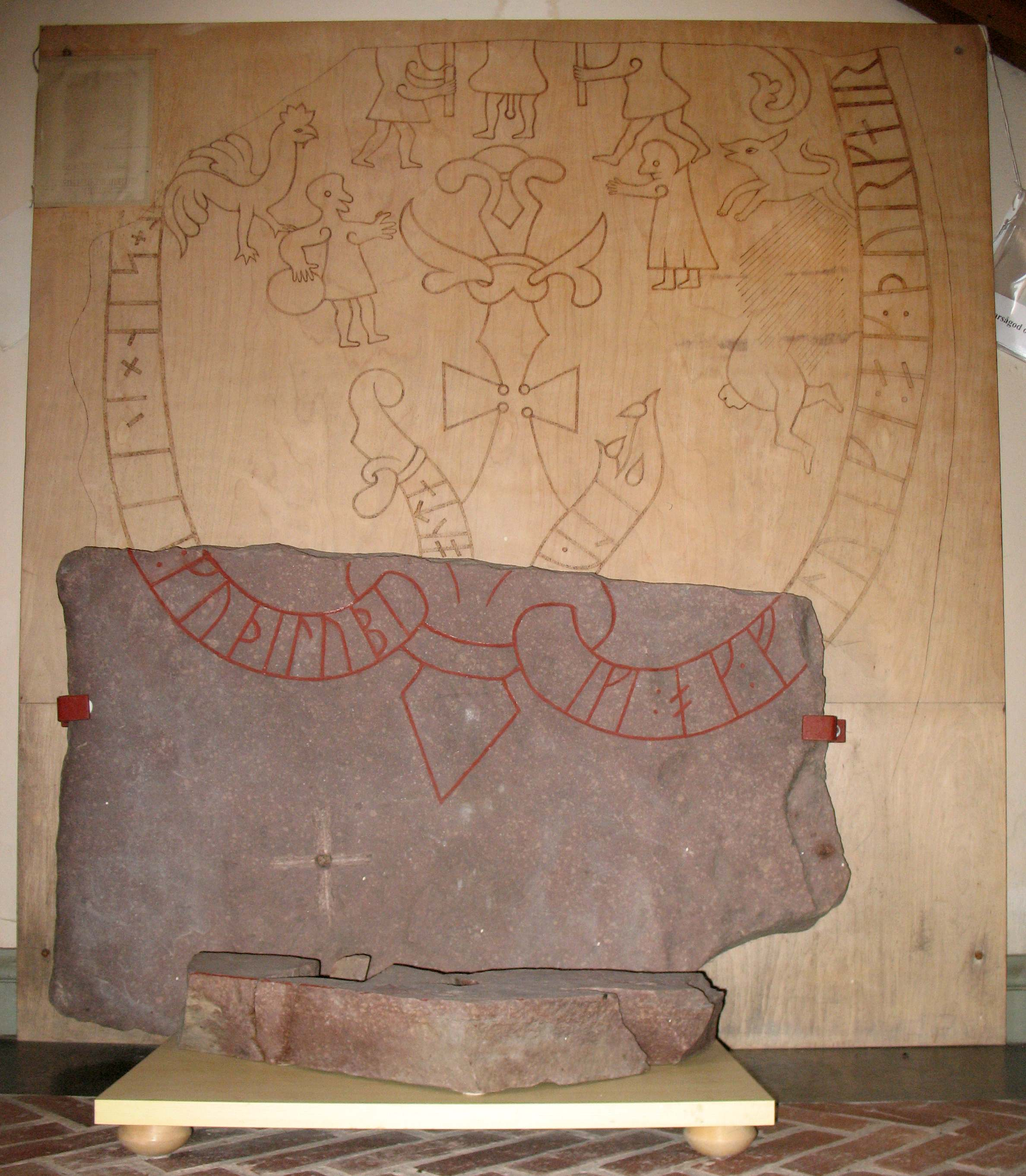
Gs 2

This sandstone runestone is classified as being carved in runestone style Pr2 and was rediscovered in 1974 outside the wall of the church of Österfärnebo. It is not listed as a Sigurd runestone by the Rundata project, and only the bottom part remains. The inscription is reconstructed based upon a drawing made during a runestone survey in 1690 by Ulf Christoffersson, and originally included several figures from the Sigurd story, including a bird, Ótr with the ring, and a horse.

The personal name Þorgeirr in the runic text means "Thor's spear".

Latin transliteration:

[ily]iki : ok : f[uluiki × ok : þurkair ... ...- × sin × snilan] : kuþ ilubi on(t)[a]

Old Norse transcription:

Illugi ok Fullugi ok Þorgæiʀʀ ... ... sinn sniallan. Guð hialpi anda.

English translation:

"Illugi and Fullugi and Þorgeirr ... their able ... May God help [his] spirit."

=== Gs 9 ===
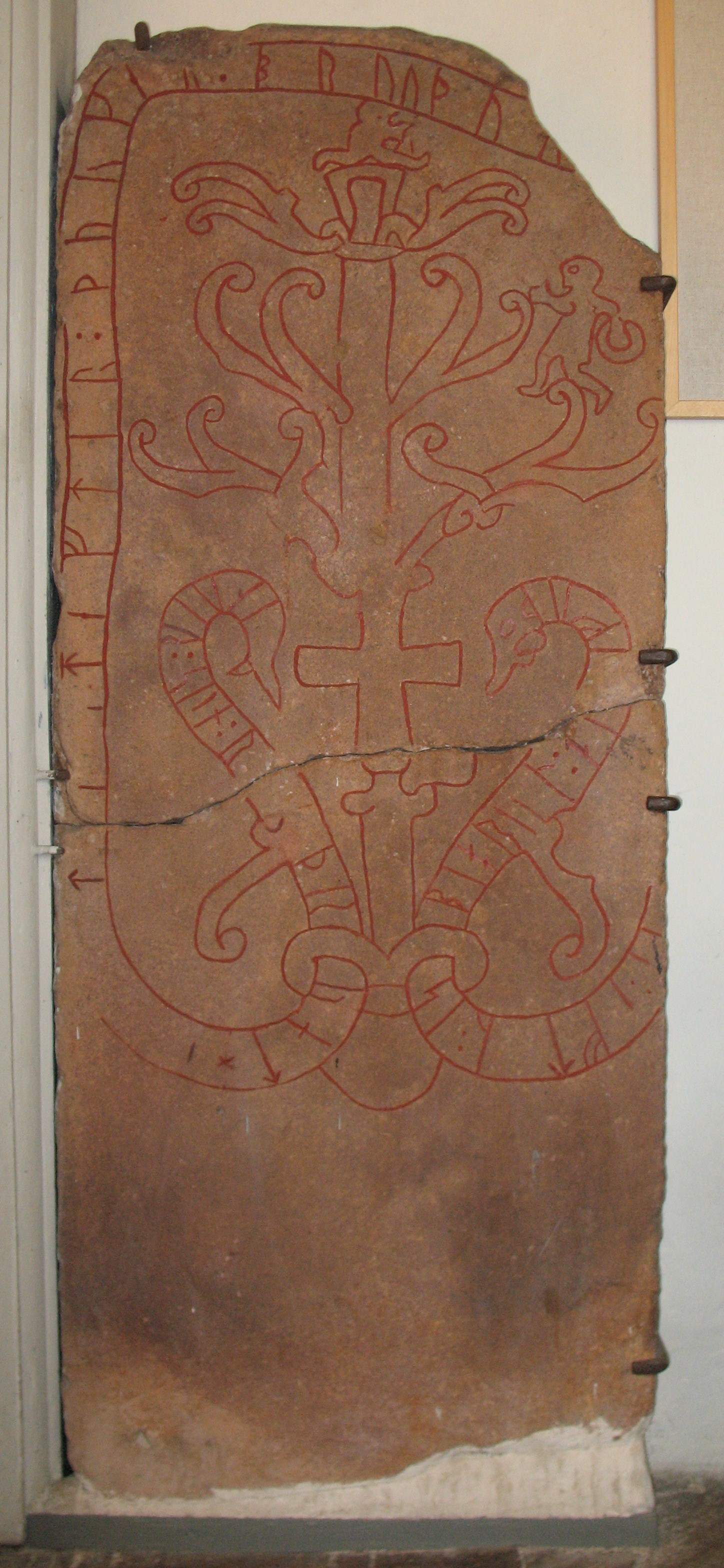
Gs 9

This runestone is found at the church of Årsunda and was documented during a survey in 1690. The top of the stone shows a running man, who by comparison with U 1163 from Drävle can be identified as Sigurd. A second figure holds a ring in his hand. A cross is in the center of the design. Similar to the Sigurd stones U 1163, U 1175, Sö 327, and Gs 2, this combination of a cross and the Sigurd figure is taken as evidence of acceptance and use by Christianity of legends from the Völsung cycle during the transition period from paganism. The runic text, which is reconstructed from the 1690 drawing, uses a bind rune that combines the e- and l-runes in the name of the mother, Guðelfr.

Latin transliteration:

(i)nu-r : sun : r[u]þ[u](r) at × [uili](t)... ...[Ris:]t eftir : þurker : bruþu[r : sin : ok : kyþe=lfi : muþur : sina : uk] : eft[i]ʀ : [a]sbiorn : o[k : o]ifuþ

Old Norse transcription:

Anun[d]r(?), sunn <ruþur>(?) at <uilit...> ... æftiʀ Þorgæiʀ, broður sinn, ok Guðælfi, moður sina ok æftiʀ Asbiorn ok <oifuþ>

English translation:

"Ǫnundr(?), <ruþur>'s son, in memory of <uilit>... ... in memory of Þorgeirr, his brother and Guðelfr, his mother, and in memory of Ásbjǫrn and <oifuþ>"

=== Gs 19 ===
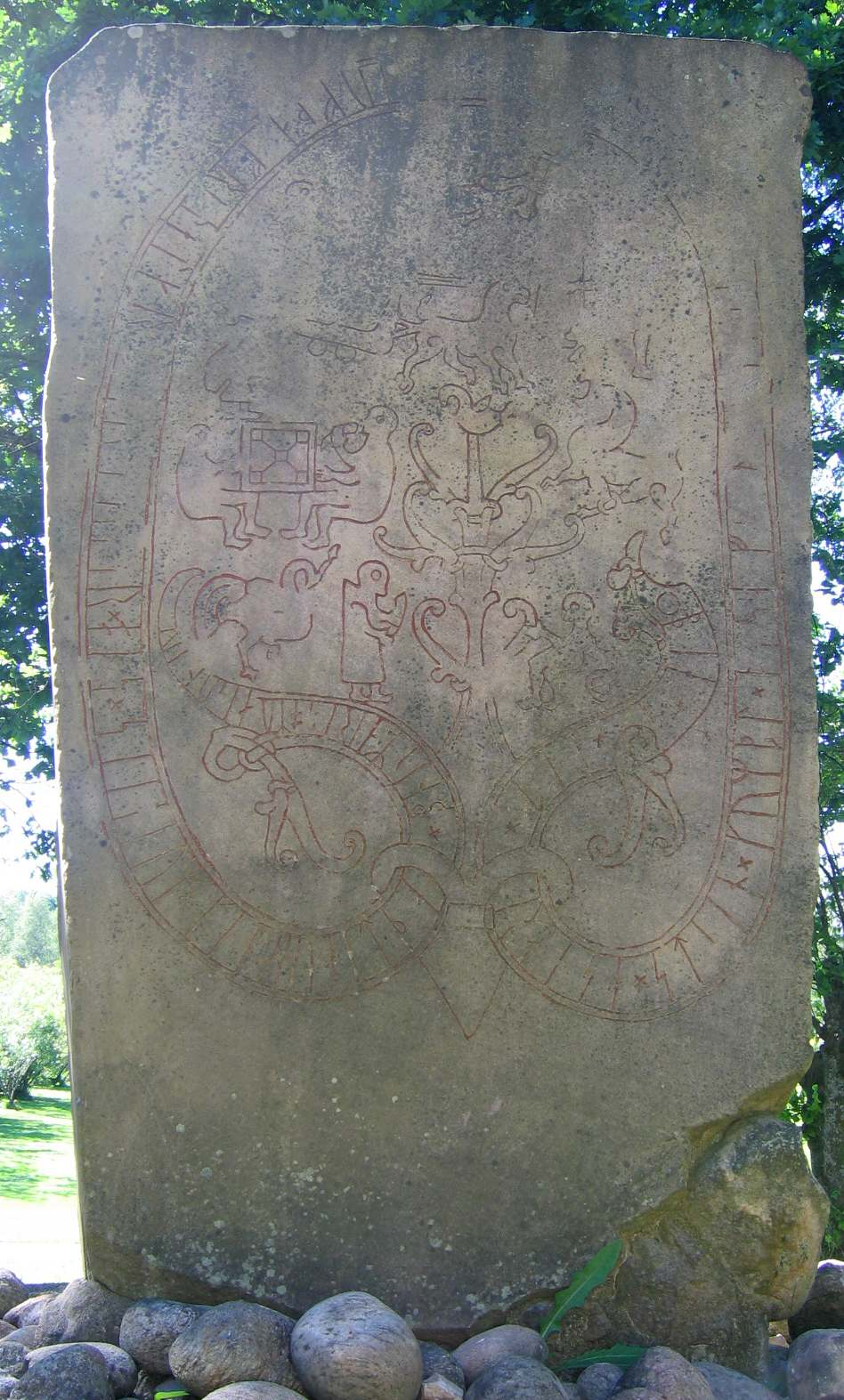
The coloring on the runestone has faded, but it shows Sigurd's arm holding the sword.

This runestone, which is tentatively categorized as style Pr2, is located at the church of Ockelbo. The original runestone was found in a foundation wall of the church in 1795 and removed and stored in the church in 1830; it was destroyed together with the church in a fire in 1904. The present runestone is a copy that was made in 1932 from drawings and raised outside the church. The runestone has several illustrations including matter from the Sigurd legends. One shows two men playing Hnefatafl, a form of the boardgame called tafl.

The name Svarthǫfði in the inscription translates as "black head" and was often used as a nickname.

Latin transliteration:

[blesa × lit × raisa × stain×kumbl × þesa × fa(i)(k)(r)(n) × ef(t)ir × sun sin × suar×aufþa × fr(i)þelfr × u-r × muþir × ons × siionum × kan : inuart : þisa × bhum : arn : (i)omuan sun : (m)(i)e(k)]

Old Norse transcription:

Blæsa let ræisa stæinkumbl þessa fagru æftiʀ sun sinn Svarthaufða. Friðælfʀ v[a]ʀ moðiʀ hans <siionum> <kan> <inuart> <þisa> <bhum> <arn> <iomuan> sun <miek>.

English translation:

"Blesa had these fair stone-monuments raised in memory of his son Svarthǫfði. Friðelfr was his mother. ... "

== Bohuslän ==
=== Bo NIYR;3 ===
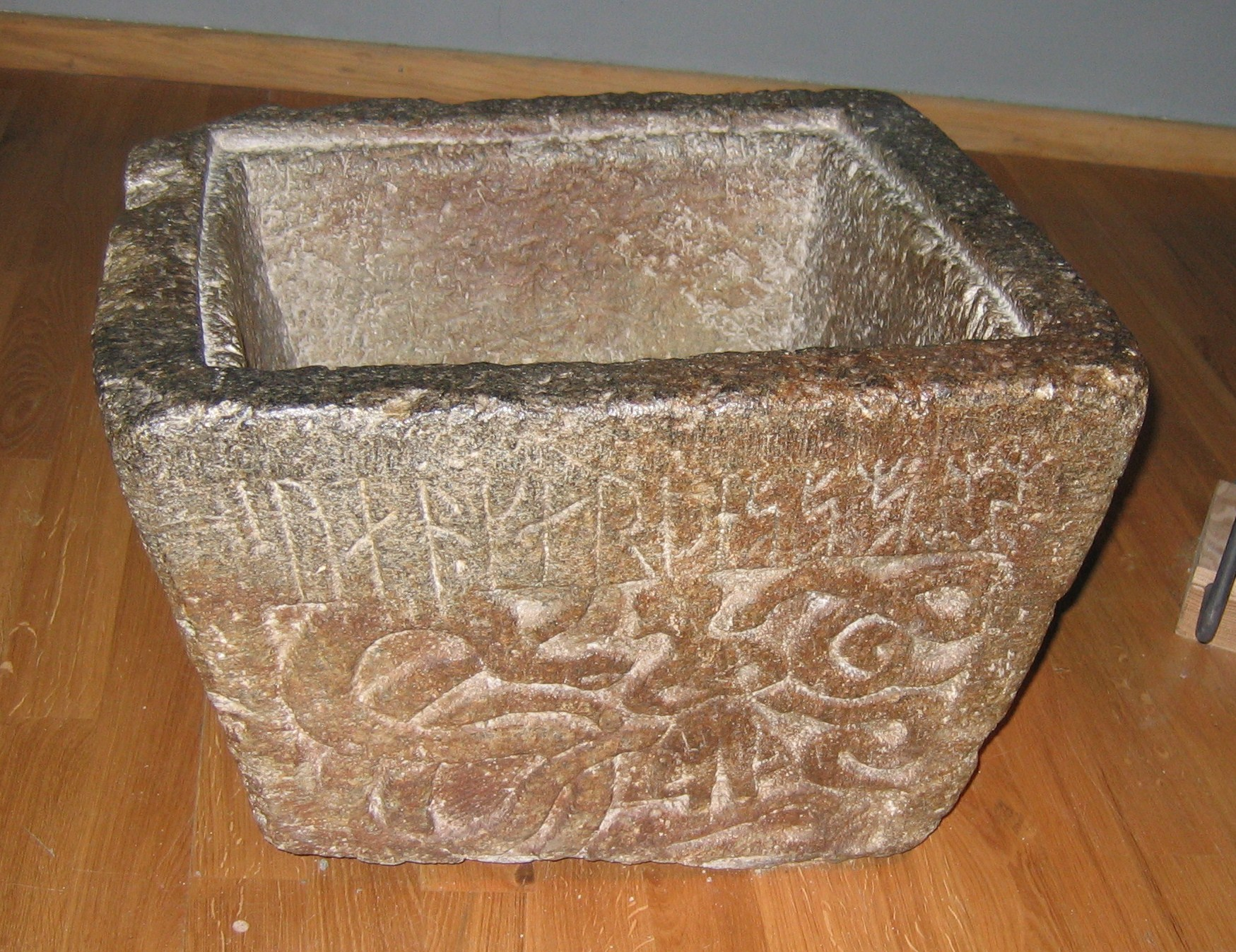
Bo NIYR;3

This baptismal font from c. 1100 is made of slate. It was discovered in pieces at the cemetery in Norum in 1847. On one side it shows Gunnar lying in the snake pit surrounded by four snakes and with a harp at his feet. Gunnar in the snake pit was used as a Biblical typology similar to that of Daniel in the lion's den in representing Christ rising unharmed from Hell. Above the snake pit panel is a runic inscription, which ends with five identical bind runes of which the last two are mirrored. The meaning of these five bind runes is not understood.

The font is currently at the Swedish Museum of National Antiquities.

svæn : kærðe <m>

Old Norse transcription:

Sveinn gerði m[ik](?).

English translation:

"Sveinn made me(?)."

== Gotland ==
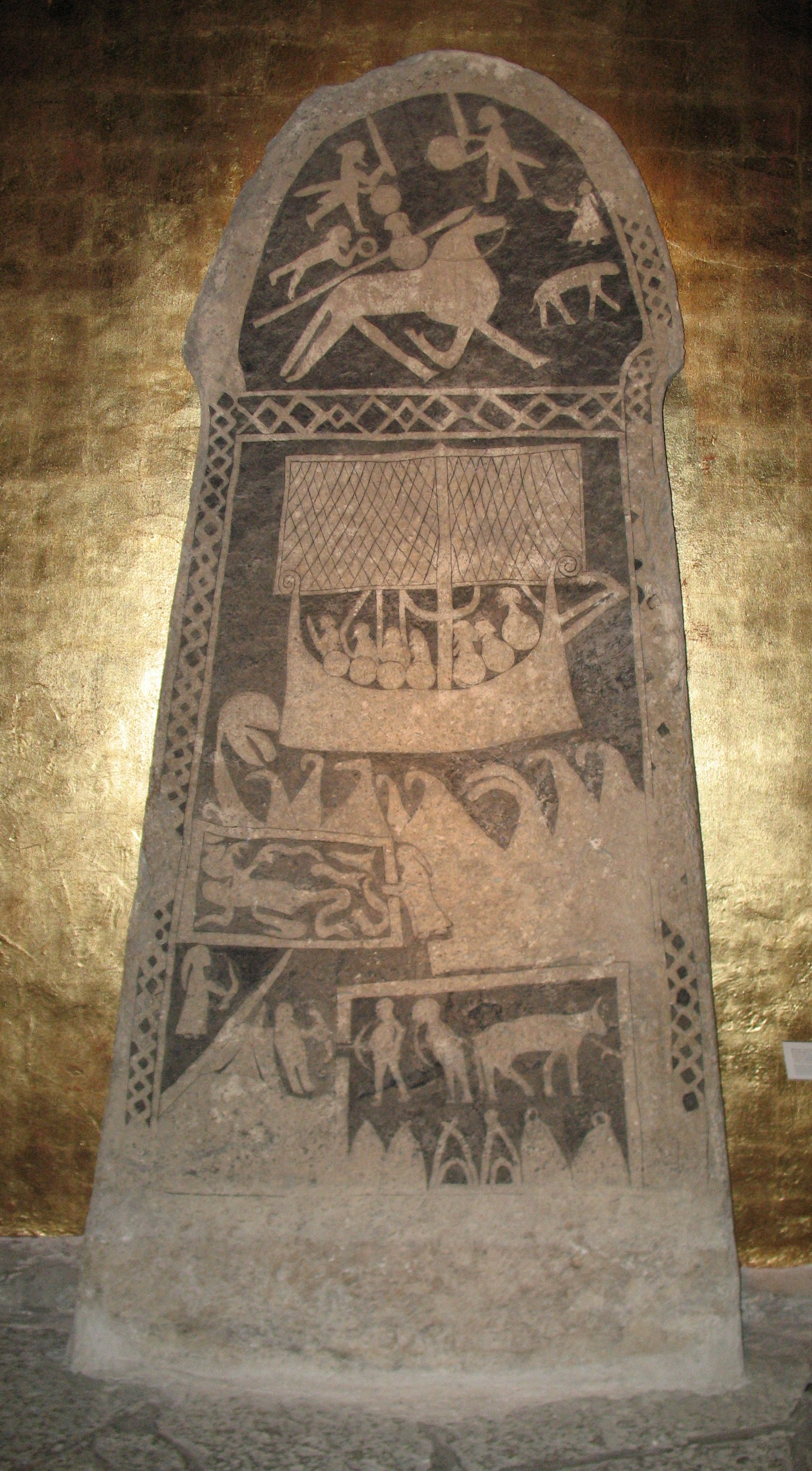
Hunninge picture stone

=== Hunninge picture stone ===
The Hunninge picture stone was found on Gotland and includes imagery that may be related to the Völsung cycle. The top section shows a man on a horse with a dog meeting a woman and two men fighting near a dead man who is holding a ring. This could represent Sigurd and Brynhild, Sigurd and Gunnar fighting, and Sigurd's death. Alternatively, the man carrying a ring could be the messenger Knéfrøðr, carrying Gudrun's warning message of a ring with a wolf's hair wrapped around it. The scene on the bottom left depicts a woman watching the snake pit where Gunnar is lying, and at the bottom three men who could be Gunnar and Högni attacking Atli.

The Hunninge picture stone is currently on display at the Gotland Museum in Visby.

== See also ==
- Hylestad Stave Church
- List of runestones
