= Södermanland Runic Inscription 292 =

Coordinates: 59°05′43″N 17°53′21″E

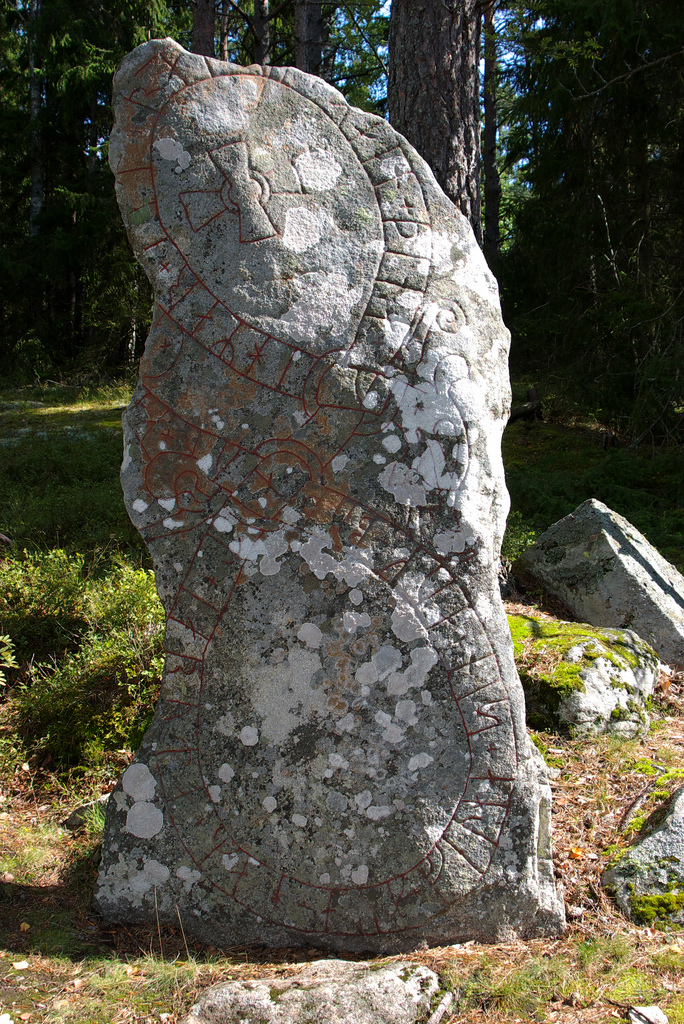
Sö 292 is located in Bröta.

Sö 292 is the Rundata catalog number for Sodermanland Runic Inscription 292, an inscription on a Viking Age memorial runestone located in Bröta, which is about six kilometers southwest of Väländan, Stockholm County, Sweden, in the historic province of Södermanland.

== Description ==
This inscription is on a runestone made of granite, 2.5 meters in height. The runic text is carved along a serpent that forms a figure of eight, the snake also enclosing a Christian cross in its upper section. The inscription style is classified as runestone style Pr3, also known as Urnes style, characterized by slim and stylized animals interwoven into tight patterns. The animal heads are typically seen in profile with slender almond-shaped eyes and upwardly curled appendages on the noses and necks.

Based on stylistic analysis, this inscription has been attributed to a runemaster named Halvdan, known for his Pr3 style inscriptions and signed inscription Sö 270 in Tyresta. Over fifteen other runestones have been attributed to him. The other inscriptions listed in Rundata that are attributed to Halvdan based upon stylistic analysis include Sö 235 in Västerby, Sö 237 in Fors, Sö 239 in Häringe, Sö 244 in Tuna, Sö 245 in Tungelsta, the now-lost Sö 247 in Ålsta, Sö 252 in Säby, Sö 256 in Älby, Sö 262 in Blista, Sö 269 in Söderby Malm, Sö 272 in Upp-Norrby, Sö 274 in Södersluss, Sö 290 in Farsta, Sö 297 in Uppinge, Sö 298 in Uringe Malm, and Sö 301 in Ågesta Bro. In this inscription, Halvdan used a + as a punctuation mark between each word of the runic text.

The carved text, although damaged, states that the stone was raised by Vígmarr as a memorial to a man named either Jôrundi or Jôrundr, who was a relative by marriage and also to his felaga, or partner. This Old Norse word is related to félag, which was used to describe a Viking Age mercantile or contractual arrangement similar to a joint venture. Several runestones that mention the deceased using some form of félag include Vg 112 in Ås, Vg 122 in Abrahamstorp, the now-lost Vg 146 in Slöta, Vg 182 in Skattegården, U 391 in Villa Karlsro, the now-lost U 954 in Söderby, DR 1 in Haddeby, DR 66 and DR 68 in Århus, DR 125 in Dalbyover, DR 127 in Hobro, DR 262 in Fosie, DR 270 in Skivarp, DR 279 in Sjörup, DR 316 in Norra Nöbbelöv, DR 318 in Håstad, DR 321 in Västra Karaby, DR 329 and DR 330 in Gårdstånga, DR 339 in Stora Köpinge, and X UaFv1914;47 in Berezanj, Ukraina. Vígmarr is a fairly rare name, but is recorded on two nearby runestones, Sö 298 in Uringe Malm and Sö Fv1971;208 in Säby. It has been suggested that the same Vígmarr was the sponsor of Sö 292 and Sö Fv1971;208 and was the deceased father memorialized in Sö 298.

== Inscription ==
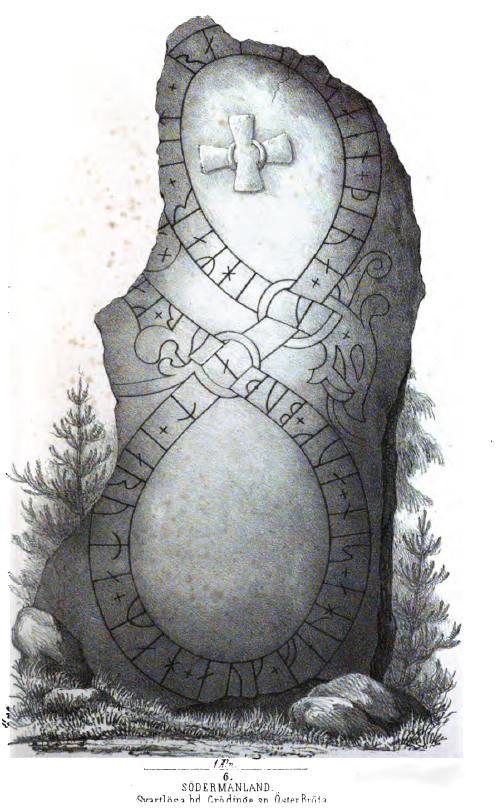
The stone from an 1855 illustration.

=== Transliteration of the runes into Latin characters ===
+ uihmar + (l)et + ra(i)-- + saen + þina + at + iaruta + mah + auk + felha + sin + auk + buþur + ka...a +

=== Transcription into Old Norse ===
Vigmarr let ræi[sa] stæin þenna at Iarunda/Iarund, mag ok felaga sinn ok broður ...

=== Translation in English ===
Vígmarr had this stone raised in memory of Jôrundi/Jôrundr, his kinsman-by-marriage and partner and the brother ...
