= Södermanland Runic Inscription 235 =

Coordinates: 59°05′10″N 17°54′01″E

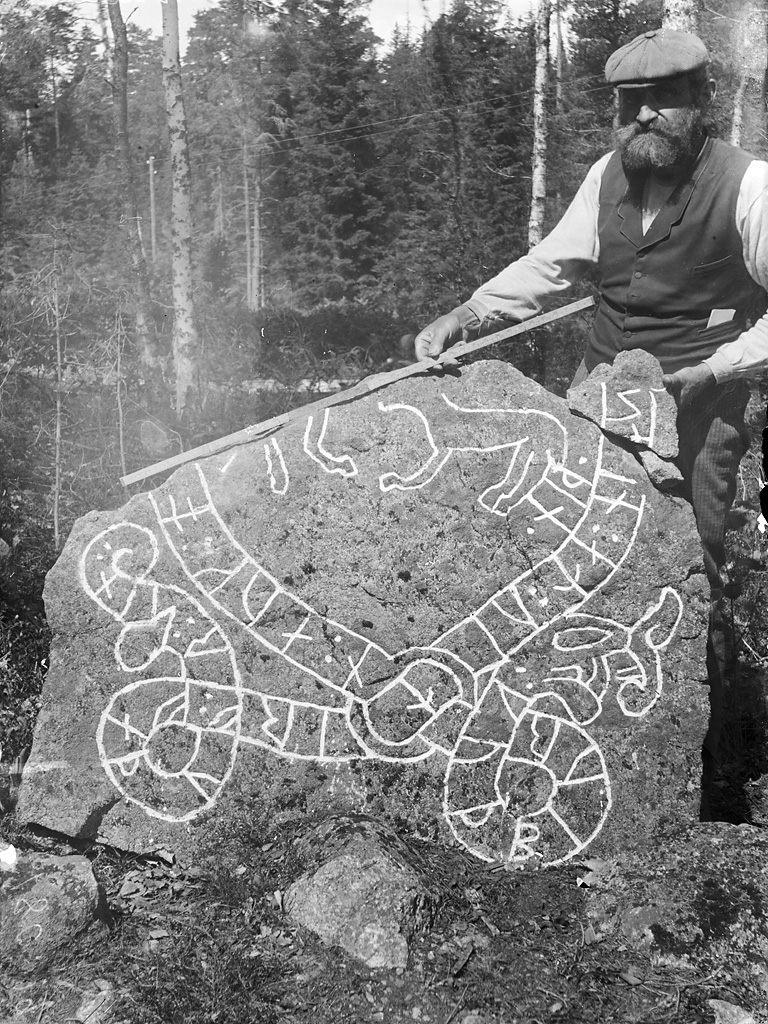
Photograph of Sö 235 in 1900.

Södermanland Runic Inscription 235 or Sö 235 is the Rundata listing for a Viking Age memorial runestone fragment that is located in Västerby, which is six kilometers southwest of Väländan, Stockholm County, Sweden, and in the historic province of Södermanland.

== Description ==
This inscription, which is missing its upper section, consists of runic text in the younger futhark carved on a serpent that once encircled two animals. The animals, which because of the missing section cannot be clearly identified, appear to have hoofs and may be deer, elk, or horses. Several Scandinavian runestones include depictions of horses, including DR 96 in Ålum, N 61 in Alstad, Sö 101 in Ramsundsberget, Sö 226 in Norra Stutby, Sö 327 in Göksten, Sö 239 in Häringe, U 375 in Vidbo, U 488 in Harg, U 599 in Hanunda, U 691 in Söderby, U 855 in Böksta, U 901 in Håmö, U 935 at the Uppsala Cathedral, and U 1003 in Frötuna. The inscription, which is 1 meter in height, is classified as being carved in runestone style Pr3, which is also known as Urnes style. This runestone style is characterized by slim and stylized animals that are interwoven into tight patterns, with the animal heads typically seen in profile with slender almond-shaped eyes and upwardly curled appendages on the noses and the necks. Based on stylistic analysis, Sö 235 has been attributed to a runemaster with the normalized name of Halvdan, who was active in the mid-11th century in Södermanland and signed the inscription Sö 270 in Tyresta. Over fifteen other runestones have been attributed to him, including Sö 237 in Fors, Sö 239 in Häringe, Sö 244 in Tuna, Sö 245 in Tungelsta, the now-lost Sö 247 in Ålsta, Sö 252 in Säby, Sö 256 in Älby, Sö 262 in Blista, Sö 269 in Söderby Malm, Sö 272 in Upp-Norrby, Sö 274 in Södersluss, Sö 290 in Farsta, Sö 292 in Bröta, Sö 297 in Uppinge, Sö 298 in Uringe Malm, and Sö 301 in Ågesta Bro.

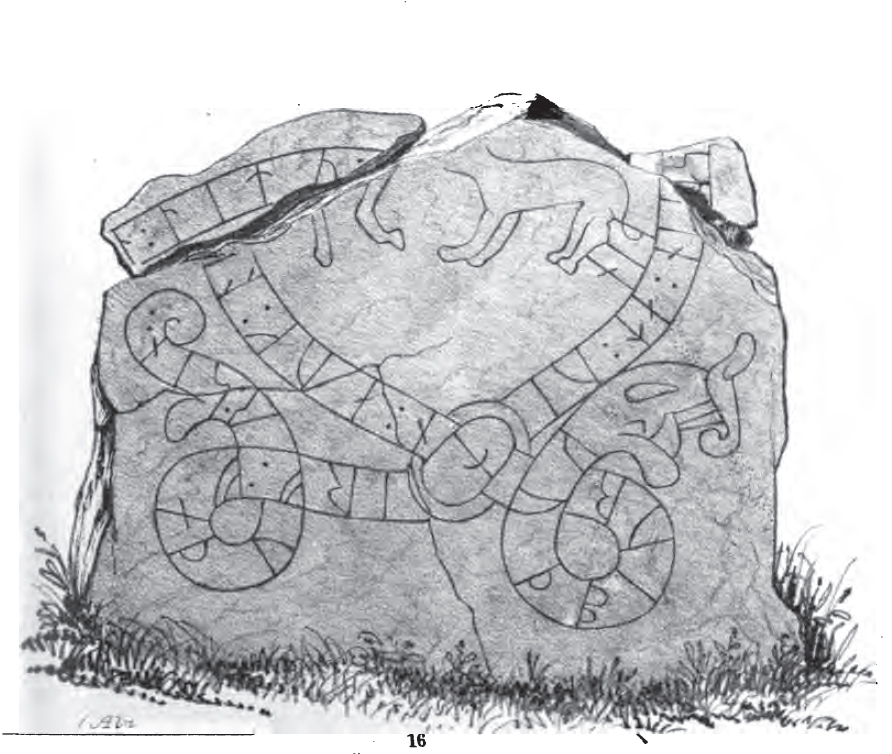
Drawing of Sö 235 published by Richard Dybeck in 1855.

The remaining runic text on this fragment, which appears to follow the memorial formula typical on runestones of this period, was recorded on a drawing published in 1855. Since then, additional portions of the stone have been lost. The reconstructed text from the damaged stone states that the sponsor of the runestone was a man named Guðbjôrn and at least one other brother who raised the stone in memory of their father Védjarfr. Similar to his other inscriptions, Halvdan used a word divider punctuation mark between each word of the surviving text. One word of the text, * þin * or þenna, is carved inside the serpent near the hind legs of one of the animals.

== Inscription ==
=== Transliteration of the runes into Latin characters ===
: kuþbiurn : auk : o...[n : litu : ... sta]in :* þin * at : uitirf : faþur : sin *

=== Transcription into Old Norse ===
Guðbiorn ok ... letu [ræisa] stæin þenna at Vidiarf, faður sinn.

=== Translation in English ===
Guðbjôrn and ... had this stone raised in memory of Védjarfr, their father.
