= Bjälbo runestones =

Viking memorial runestones in Bjälbo, Sweden

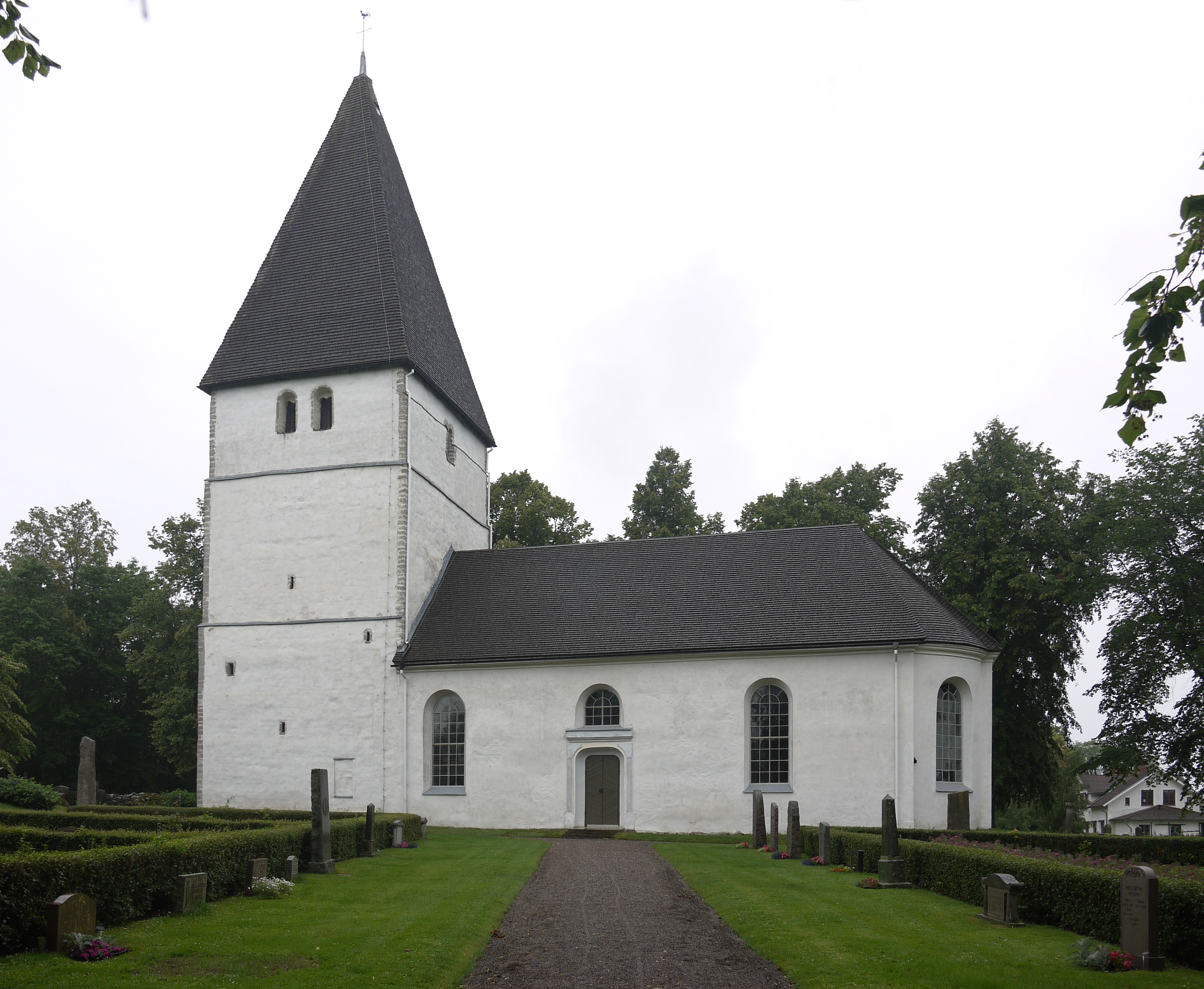
The church at Bjälbo, where the runestones were found.

The Bjälbo runestones are three Viking Age memorial runestones, one of which has been lost, located at Bjälbo, which is a village in Mjölby Municipality, Östergötland, Sweden. One of the inscriptions provides evidence of the existence of guilds in Sweden during this period.

== Ög 64 ==
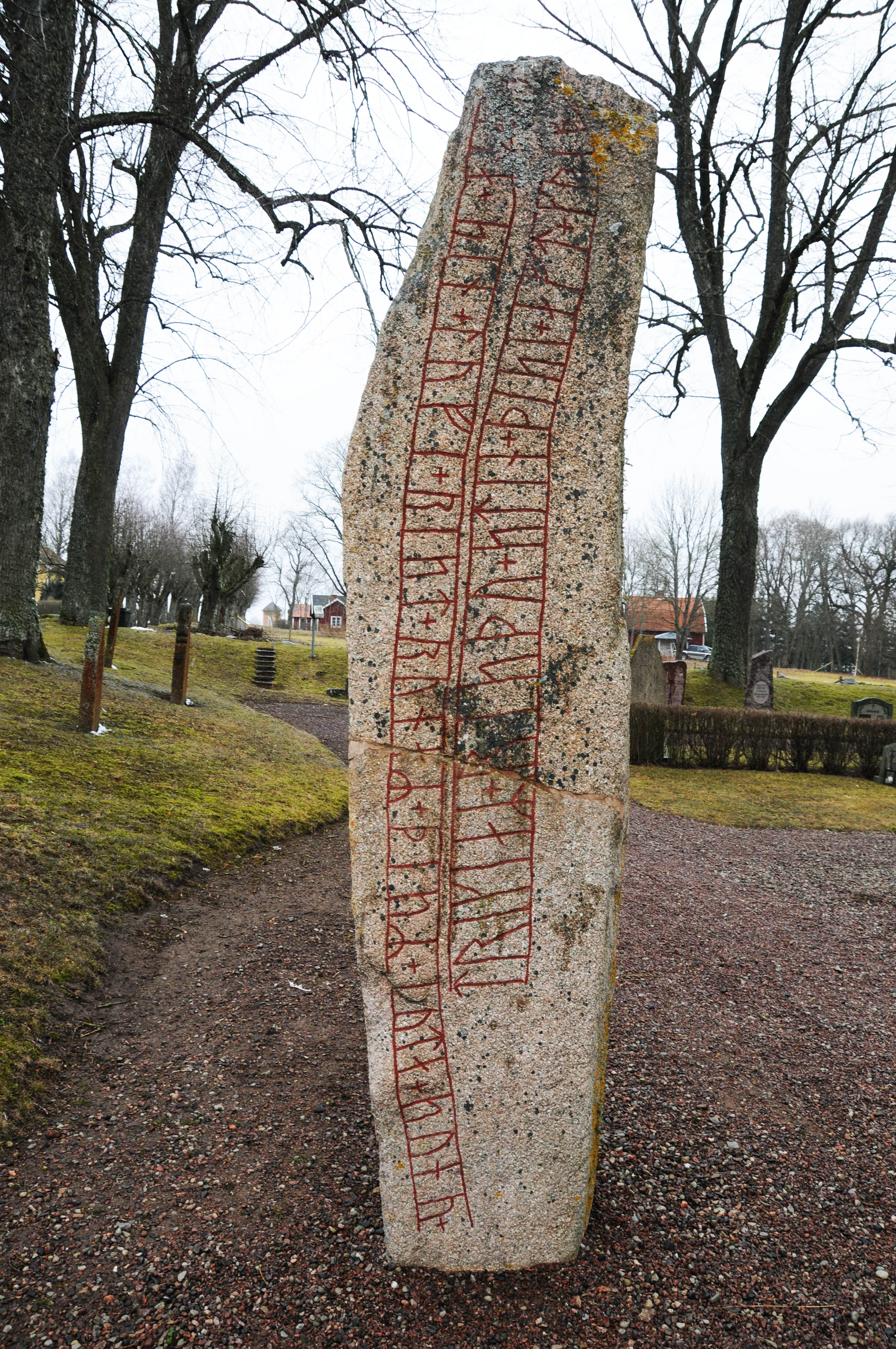
Runestone Ög 64.

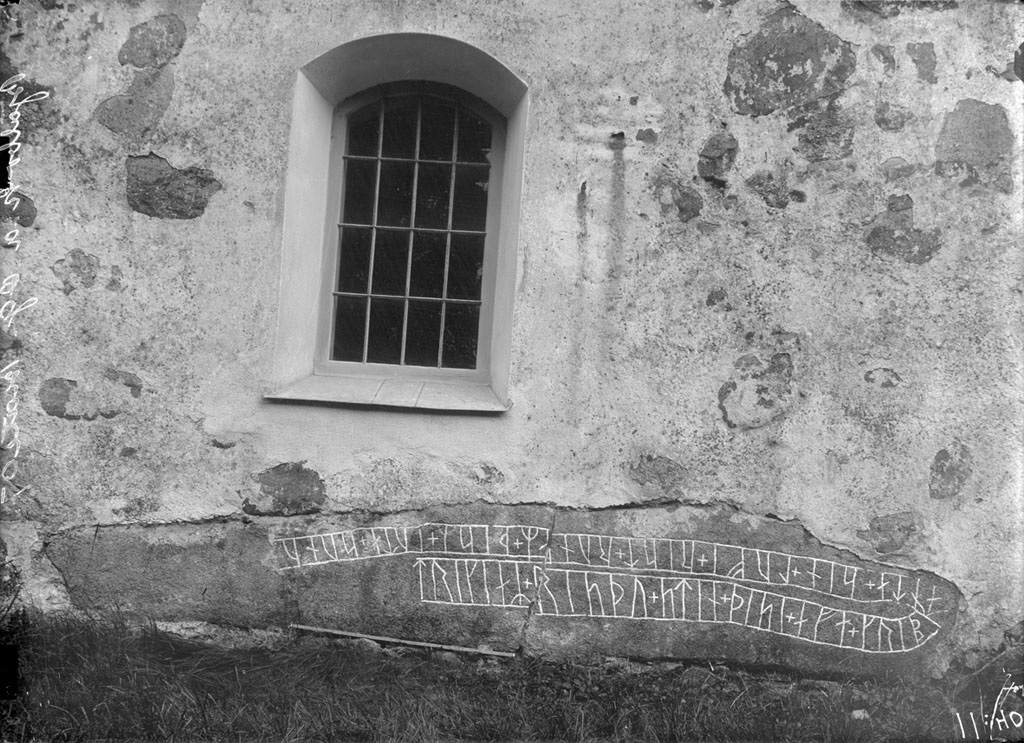
A 1907 photograph showing Ög 64 in the church wall.

Östergötland Runic Inscription 64 or Ög 64 is the Rundata designation for a granite runestone that is 3.2 meters in height and which was originally found in the wall of the Bjälbo church. Before the historic significance of runestones was understood, they were often re-used as materials in the construction of roads, bridges, and buildings such as churches. The stone was removed from the wall, repaired, and raised in the churchyard in 1935 along with Ög 66. The inscription consists of runic text in the younger futhark that curves once to make two lines. The inscription is classified as being carved in runestone style RAK, which is the classification for runic text bands that have straight ends without any attached serpent or beast heads. There is nothing in the text or design of the inscription that identifies it as being a Christian memorial. The inscription is signed by a runemaster named Lófi. No other surviving runestones have his signature.

The runic text states that the stone was raised as a memorial to a man named Greipr by members of a Viking Age guild, who do not name themselves individually unless the runemaster Lofi was also a member of the guild. Ög 64 is one of four runestones that mention guilds in Viking Age Sweden, the others being U 379 in Kyrkogården, U 391 in Prästgatan, and Ög MÖLM1960;230 in Törnevalla. These stones and others discussing félags are evidence of the trading activities during this period of Scandinavian history. The guild-members refer to themselves as drængiaʀ, translated as "valiant men." Drengr is normally a title associated with warriors, but on the runestone Ög MÖLM1960;230 it was used as the name of another guild-member, suggesting that the term drengr was also used among merchants.

trikiaʀ + risþu + stin + þisi + aft + krib kilta + sin + lufi + rist + runaʀ + þisʀ + iuta + sunu
Drængiaʀ {} ræisþu {} stæin {} þennsi {} æft {} Græip, gilda {} sinn, {} Lofi {} ræist {} runaʀ {} þessaʀ, {} Iuta {} sun.
Valiant men raised this stone in memory of Greipr, their guild-brother - Lófi carved these runes - Júti's son.

== Ög 65 ==
Östergötland Runic Inscription 65 or Ög 65 is the designation for an inscription that was recorded at the Bjälbo church that has since been lost. The stone, based on its partial reconstructed text, was raised by a man as a memorial to his wife who may have been named Ragnhildr.

... (l)*et ...a-ua -...ml : if-...- ...-il-ti -u-u s--*a -... ...
... let [h]a[gg]va [ku]mbl {} æf[tiʀ] [Ragnh]ildi(?), [k]u[n]u s[in]a. ... ...
... had the monument cut in memory of Ragnhildr, his wife ... ...

== Ög 66 ==
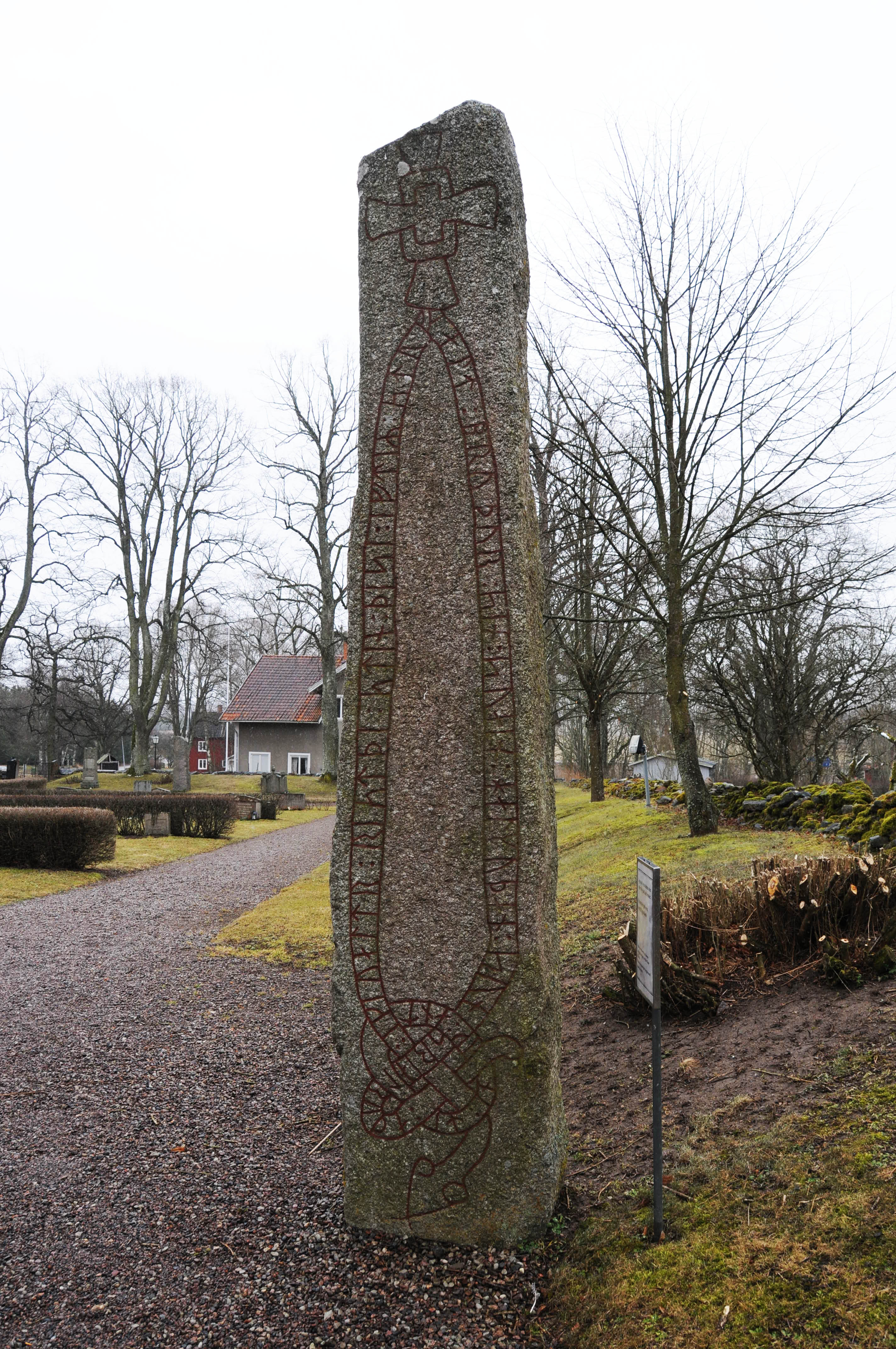
Runestone Ög 66.

Östergötland Runic Inscription 66 or Ög 66 is the Rundata catalog number for a granite runestone that is 4 meters in height. The stone had been part of the Bjälbo church, and was moved into the churchyard in 1935. The inscription consists of text in the younger futhark carved in a serpent whose head and tail make a knot at the bottom of the stone. Above the serpent is a cross, identifying the memorial as Christian. The inscription is classified as being carved in runestone style Fp, which is the classification for text bands with attached serpent or beast heads depicted as seen from above.

The runic text states that the stone was raised by Ingivaldr as a memorial to his brother Styfjaldr, who was the son of Spjallboði. Because one rule followed in craving runes in stone was that two consecutive identical letters were represented by a single rune, even when the two identical letters are at the end of one word and the start of a second word, and word divider punctuation marks were not always used consistently, Rundata recognizes two possible transliterations of the runic text as being valid. The first, designated as "P" below, recognizes possible double letters and spaces and transcribes the runes from the end of the text as : i it : in ik : anti, meaning i ætt, en ek ændi ("and I ended (it)"). The other recognized version, which is designated as "Q," is based upon a review published in 2007 that transliterates the runes as : it : inik : ant, meaning hæit inni'k ænt ("I proclaim the promise fulfilled").

: ikiualtr : ristþi : stin : þisi : eftiʀ : stufialt : bruþur : sin : suain : halkuþan : sun sbialbuþa : i it : in ik : anti
{} Ingivaldr {} ræisti {} stæin {} þennsi {} æftiʀ {} Styfiald, {} broður {} sinn, {} svæin {} allgoðan, {} sun Spiallbuða {} i ætt, {} en ek {} ændi.
Ingivaldr raised this stone in memory of Styfjaldr, his brother, an excellent lad, the son of Spjallboði in family, and I ended (it).

: ikiualtr : ristþi : stin : þisi : eftiʀ : stufialt : bruþur : sin : suain : halkuþan : sun sbialbuþa : it : inik : ant
{} Ingivaldr {} ræisti {} stæin {} þennsi {} æftiʀ {} Styfiald, {} broður {} sinn, {} svæin {} allgoðan, {} sun Spiallbuða. {} Hæit {} inni'k {} ænt.
Ingivaldr raised this stone in memory of Styfjaldr, his brother, an excellent lad, the son of Spjallboði. I proclaim the promise fulfilled.
