= Södermanland Runic Inscription 239 =

Coordinates: 59.0397°N 18.0144°E

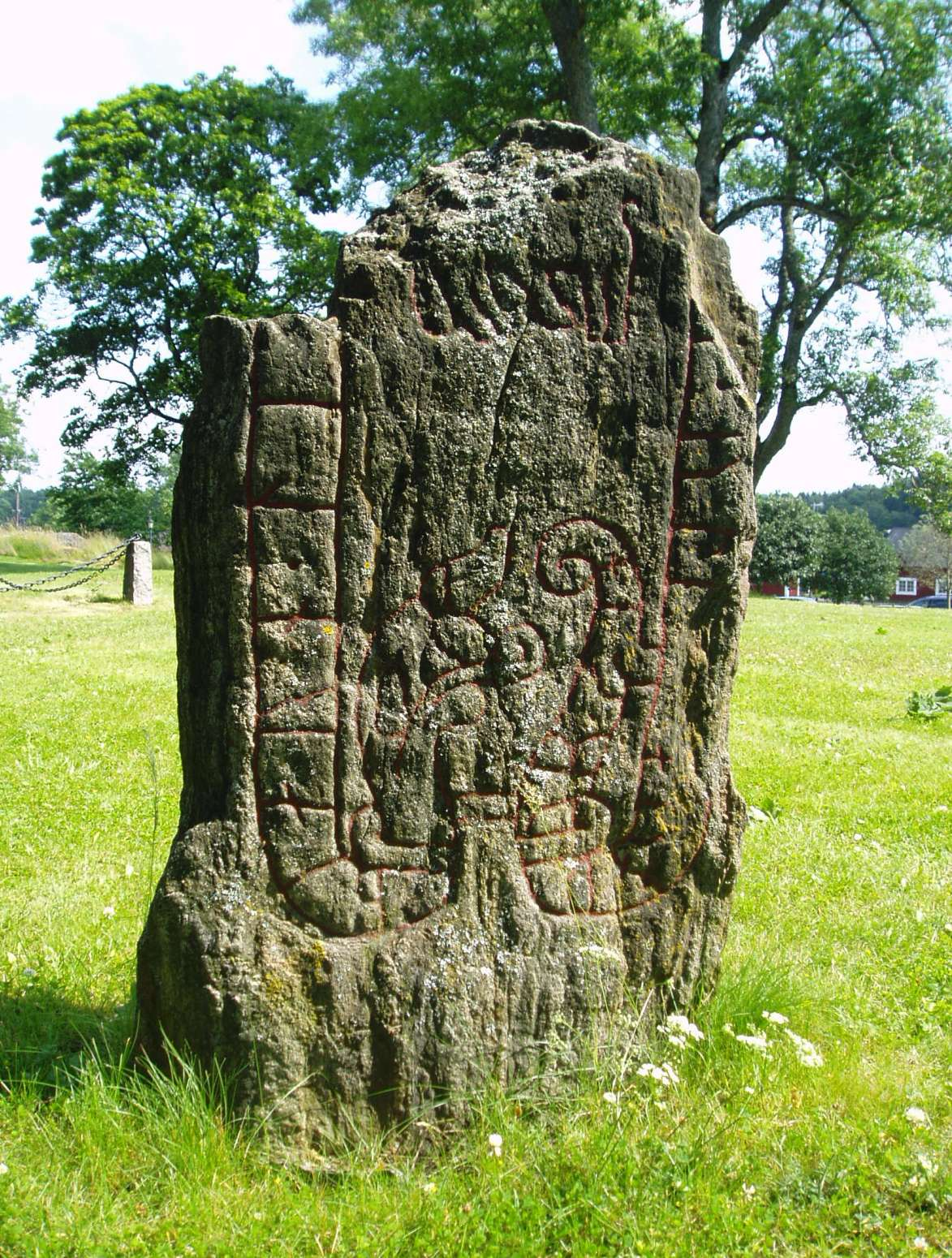
The Sö 239 runestone fragment.

Södermanland Runic Inscription 239 or Sö 239 is the Rundata catalog listing for a Viking Age memorial runestone fragment that is located in Häringe, which is about one kilometer east of Landfjärden, Stockholm County, Sweden, which is in the historic province of Södermanland.

== Description ==
The damaged inscription on Sö 239, which is missing its upper section, is 1.4 meters in height and consists of runic text in the younger futhark that is carved on a serpent along the outer edge of the stone with a rider on a horse depicted in the center of the inscription. Several other Scandinavian runestones include depictions of horses, including DR 96 in Ålum, N 61 in Alstad, Sö 101 in Ramsundsberget, Sö 226 in Norra Stutby, Sö 327 in Göksten, U 375 in Vidbo, U 488 in Harg, U 599 in Hanunda, U 691 in Söderby, U 855 in Böksta, U 901 in Håmö, U 935 at the Uppsala Cathedral, and U 1003 in Frötuna. The inscription is classified as being carved in runestone style Pr3, which is also known as Urnes style. This runestone style is characterized by slim and stylized animals that are interwoven into tight patterns, with the animal heads typically seen in profile with slender almond-shaped eyes and upwardly curled appendages on the noses and the necks. Based on stylistic analysis, Sö 239 has been attributed to a runemaster with the normalized name of Halvdan, who was active in the mid-11th century in Södermanland and signed the inscription Sö 270 in Tyresta. Over fifteen other runestones have been attributed to him, including Sö 235 in Västerby, Sö 237 in Fors, Sö 244 in Tuna, Sö 245 in Tungelsta, the now-lost Sö 247 in Ålsta, Sö 252 in Säby, Sö 256 in Älby, Sö 262 in Blista, Sö 269 in Söderby Malm, Sö 272 in Upp-Norrby, Sö 274 in Södersluss, Sö 290 in Farsta, Sö 292 in Bröta, Sö 297 in Uppinge, Sö 298 in Uringe Malm, and Sö 301 in Ågesta Bro. Sö 239 was noted in the early 1800s, and was found during an inspection in 1865 with the inscription side face-down. The stone was erected in 1897 east of the entrance to the Häringe slott, a Swedish castle.

The remaining runic text on this fragment, which appears to follow the memorial formula typical on runestones of this period, suggests that the sponsor of the runestone was a man named Bjôrn who raised the stone in memory of his brother Ulfr. Similar to his other inscriptions, Halvdan used a word divider punctuation mark between each word of the surviving text.

== Inscription ==
=== Transliteration of the runes into Latin characters ===
biarn * li(t) ... ...- * ul- -(o)(r)oþur * sen *

=== Transcription into Old Norse ===
Biorn let ... ... Ul[f, b]roður senn.

=== Translation in English ===
Bjôrn had ... ... Ulfr, his brother.
