= Anaxis =

Anaxis (Ancient Greek: Ἄναξις) was an obscure Boeotian writer of uncertain date who wrote a history of Greece, which was carried down to 360 BCE, the year before the accession of Philip II of Macedon to the kingdom of Macedonia. This history is now lost.

It has been proposed by some scholars, notably Ernst von Stern, that the history of Anaxis was relied on in part by Plutarch in his life of the Boeotian Pelopidas.
