= Södermanland Runic Inscription 298 =

Coordinates: 59.1279°N 17.9130°E

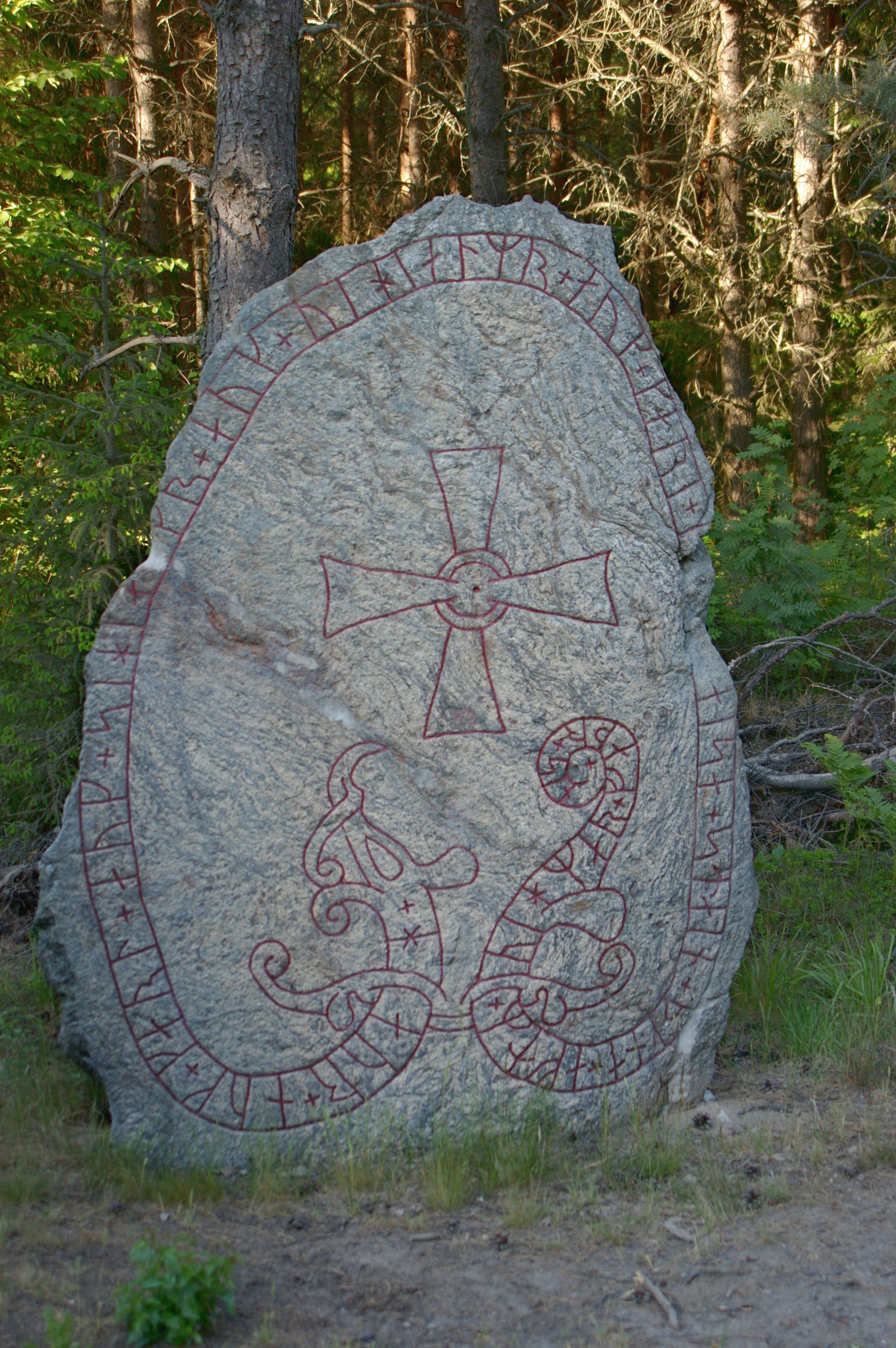
Sö 298 is located in Uringe Malm.

Sö 298 is the Rundata catalog number for a Viking Age memorial runestone located in Uringe Malm, which is about four kilometers west of Väländan, Stockholm County, Sweden, in the historic province of Södermanland.

== Description ==
This runestone, which is made of granite and is 2.3 meters in height, consists of runic text carved on a serpent that surrounds a Christian cross. This stone has been known to runologists for a few hundred years. In 1939 the stone was moved along the road 15 meters and reset. The inscription is classified as being carved in runestone style Pr3, which is also known as Urnes style. This runestone style is characterized by slim and stylized animals that are interwoven into tight patterns. The animal heads are typically seen in profile with slender almond-shaped eyes and upwardly curled appendages on the noses and the necks. Based on stylistic analysis, this inscription has been attributed to a runemaster named Halvdan, who is known for his Pr3 style inscriptions and signed inscription Sö 270 in Tyresta. Over fifteen other runestones have been attributed to him. The other inscriptions listed in Rundata that are attributed to Halvdan based upon stylistic analysis include Sö 235 in Västerby, Sö 237 in Fors, Sö 239 in Häringe, Sö 244 in Tuna, Sö 245 in Tungelsta, the now-lost Sö 247 in Ålsta, Sö 252 in Säby, Sö 256 in Älby, Sö 262 in Blista, Sö 269 in Söderby Malm, Sö 272 in Upp-Norrby, Sö 274 in Södersluss, Sö 290 in Farsta, Sö 292 in Bröta, Sö 297 in Uppinge, and Sö 301 in Ågesta Bro. In this inscription, Halvdan used a + as a punctuation mark between each word of the runic text.

The runic text states that four brothers Haurr, Karl, Sighjalmr, and a brother named either Véhjalmr or Víghjalmr raised the stone as a memorial for their father Vígmarr. Vígmarr is a fairly rare name, but is recorded on two nearby runestones, Sö 292 in Bröta (which was also attributed to Halvdan) and Sö Fv1971;208 in Säby. It has been suggested that the same Vígmarr was the sponsor of Sö 292 and Sö Fv1971;208 and was the deceased father memorialized in Sö 298.

== Inscription ==
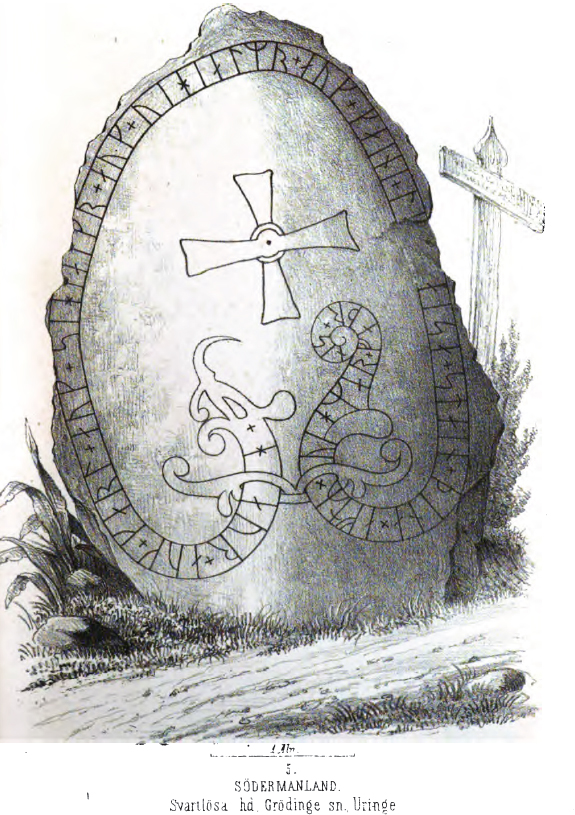
The stone from an 1855 illustration.

=== Transliteration of the runes into Latin characters ===
× haur + nuk + karl + auk + sihia--r + auk + uihialmr + auk + kare + (l)--- -aisa + stain + þina + aftʀ + uihmar + faþr + sin +

=== Transcription into Old Norse ===
Haurr ok Karl ok Sighia[lm]ʀ ok Vihialmʀ/Vighialmʀ ok Kari l[etu r]æisa stæin þenna æftiʀ Vigmar, faður sinn.

=== Translation in English ===
Haurr and Karl and Sighjalmr and Véhjalmr/Víghjalmr and Kári had this stone raised in memory of Vígmarr, their father.
