= Södermanland Runic Inscription 245 =

Coordinates: 59.0956°N 18.0363°E

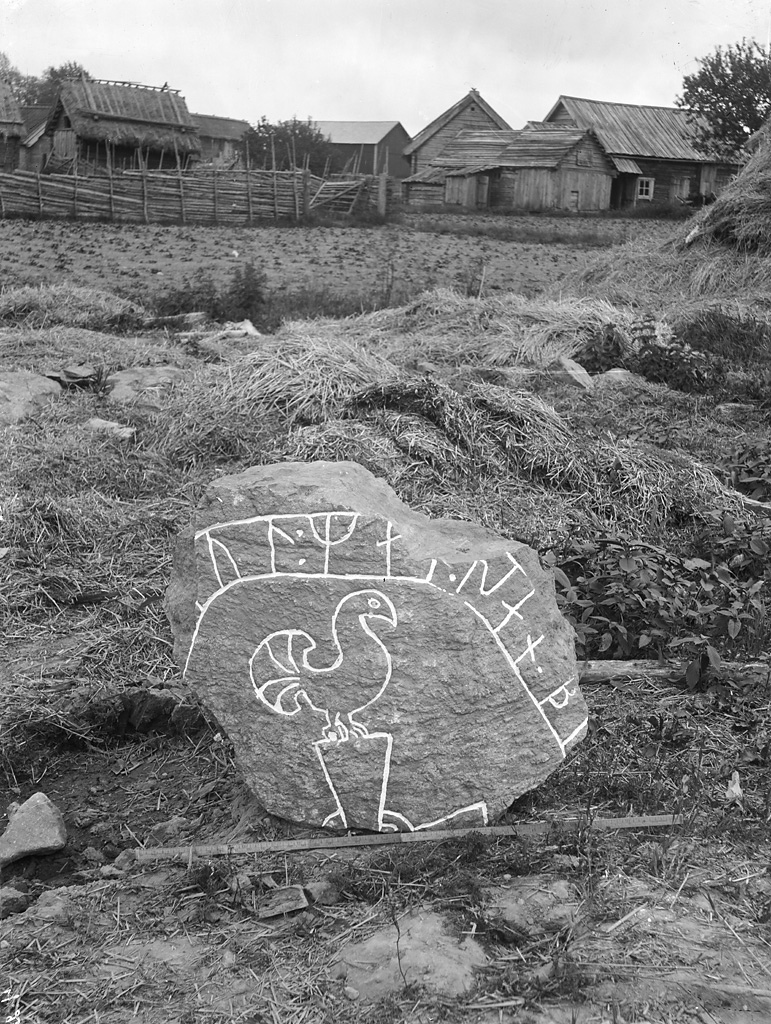
Photograph of Sö 245 taken in 1900 by Erik Brate.

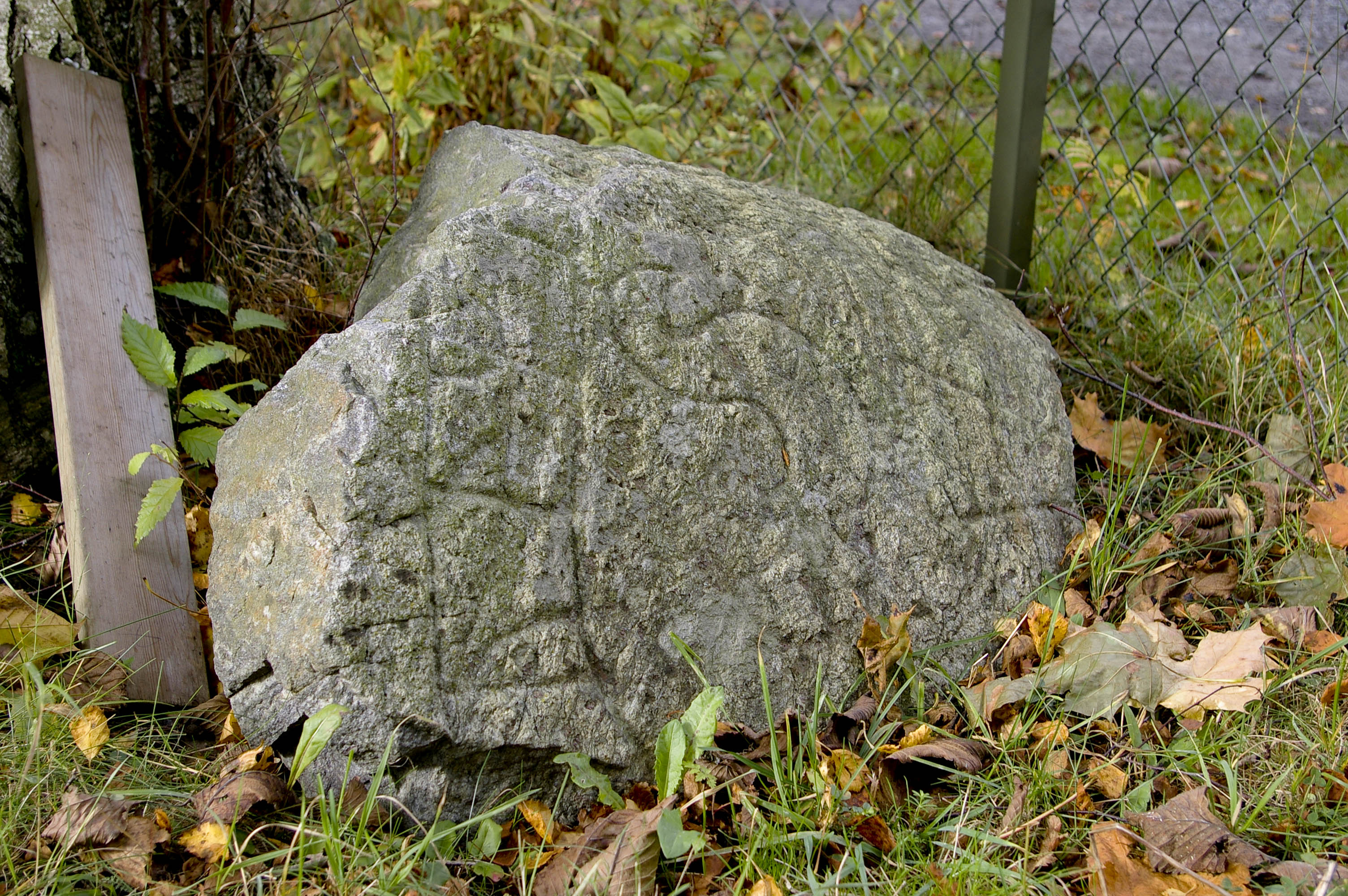
Sö 245 in 2007.

Södermanland Runic Inscription 245 or Sö 245 is the Rundata catalog number for a Viking Age runestone fragment that is located in Tungelsta, which is about two kilometers west of Västerhaninge, Stockholm County, Sweden, which was in the historic province of Södermanland.

== Description ==
The inscription on the fragment Sö 245, which is about 0.6 meters in height in the upright position, consists of runic text within a band and a depiction of a bird standing on what appears to be a cross. The depiction of the bird on the cross is very similar to that depicted on inscription Sö 270 in Tyresta, which has been interpreted as being a cock. Placed on a cross, the cock would be interpreted as a Christian symbol meaning rebirth and vigilance, similar to weathercocks that are on top of churches today. Based upon the similarity to Sö 270, Sö 245 is attributed to a runemaster named Halfdan, which has been normalized as Halvdan, who placed his signature on Sö 270. Several other inscriptions are attributed to Halvdan based upon stylistic analysis include Sö 235 in Västerby, Sö 237 in Fors, Sö 239 in Häringe, Sö 244 in Tuna, the now-lost Sö 247 in Ålsta, Sö 252 in Säby, Sö 256 in Älby, Sö 262 in Blista, Sö 269 in Söderby Malm, Sö 272 in Upp-Norrby, Sö 274 in Södersluss, Sö 290 in Farsta, Sö 292 in Bröta, Sö 297 in Uppinge, Sö 298 in Uringe Malm, and Sö 301 in Ågesta Bro. The current location of Sö 245 is not considered to be the original location of the runestone. When Sö 245 was surveyed in 1910 it was suggested that other fragments of the runestone might be located in the walls of barns in local farms or in a nearby pile of rocks, but to date no other fragments of the Sö 245 runestone have been clearly identified.

Although there are runes visible within the runic band on the Sö 245 fragment that have been transliterated, an interpretation of the damaged text into Old Norse is not considered possible. Halvdan often used a punctuation mark consisting of two dots between each word in the runic text and three such marks are present in the fragmentary text of Sö 245.

== Inscription ==
=== Transliteration of the runes into Latin characters ===
...ul : ma- : san : (b)-...
