= Bjäresjö Church =

- Bjäresjö kyrka
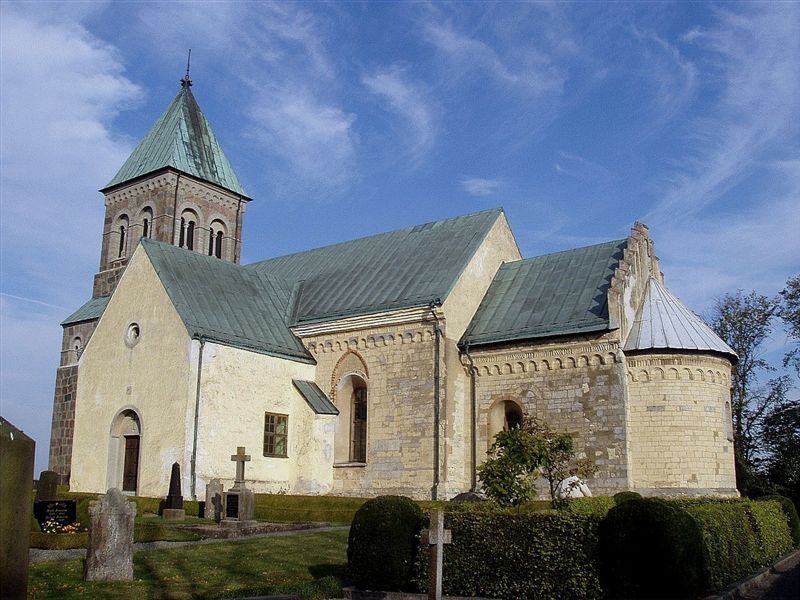
- Bjäresjö Church

- 55°27′44″N 13°45′00″E
- Country: Sweden
- Denomination: Church of Sweden

Administration
- Diocese: Lund

Bjäresjö Church (Swedish: Bjäresjö kyrka) is a medieval church in Bjäresjö, in the province of Skåne, Sweden. The church contains several medieval mural paintings as well as a richly decorated Romanesque baptismal font.

== History and architecture ==
There was probably a wooden church in the same spot as the current church as early as the 11th century. It was replaced by the present stone church around 1150. The church was built using unusually expensive materials (such as delicately cut sandstone instead of fieldstone) and is unusually richly decorated. The apse in particular displays Romanesque sculptures unusual for a countryside church. It has been assumed that the building of the church was financed by a local lord, indicating that this area of the province was important also politically during the early Middle Ages.

A broad, western tower was built during the 12th century but demolished and replaced with the currently visible Neo-Romanesque tower in 1892. Inside the church the vaults were constructed in the 14th century. A church porch was built in front of the southern entrance in the 15th century, but demolished in 1763 and replaced by the current transept. A northern transept had also been built in 1723. The exterior of the church has been described as a "miniature of Lund Cathedral".

== Murals ==
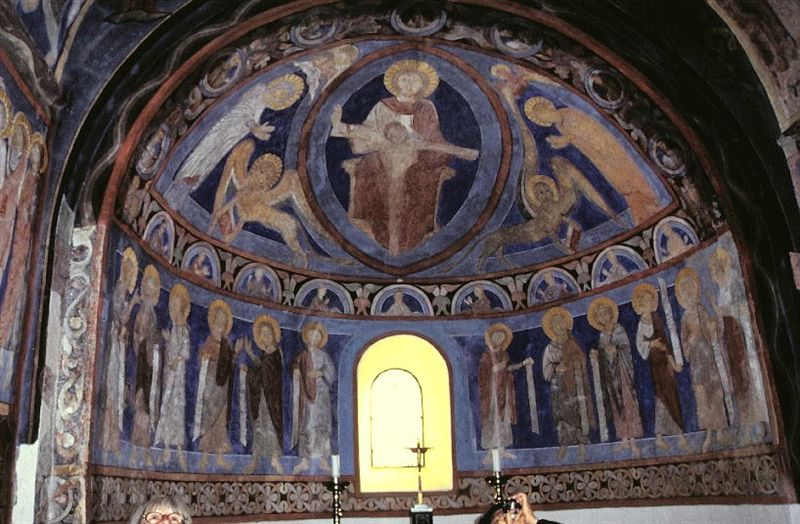
The Romanesque murals in the apse

The interior of the church contains two separate sets of medieval murals. Decorating the apse is a set of vivid Romanesque paintings, influenced by French art and made in the early 13th century but somewhat harshly restored in the 19th century. They depict God holding the crucified Christ within a mandorla, under which the Apostles are standing. On the side walls there are scenes from the Old and New Testament as well as the family tree of Jesus. The paintings adorning the vaults of the nave are from the 14th century and depict the Coronation of the Virgin and the former patron saint of the church, Saint Lawrence.

== Furnishings ==
The oldest item in the church is the richly decorated Romanesque baptismal font, adorned with images depicting the baptism of Christ. It was made in 1180 by a Romanesque sculptor called Tove. The name of the sculptor is known since another, very similar, baptismal font in Gumlösa Church is signed Tove gierhi ("Tove made me"). The church also has a triumphal cross from the 15th century, flanked by two copies of 16th-century wooden sculptures today in the Swedish History Museum but originally from Bjäresjö Church. They portray Mary and John the Evangelist. The other furnishings of the church are not medieval. Some of the pews date from the 16th century, and one of them is marked with the date 1562. The altarpiece of the church is an early Baroque piece, while the pulpit is from 1620.

Adjacent to the church are also the Bjäresjö Runestones.
