= Fölene Runestones =

Viking memorial runestones in Fölene, Sweden

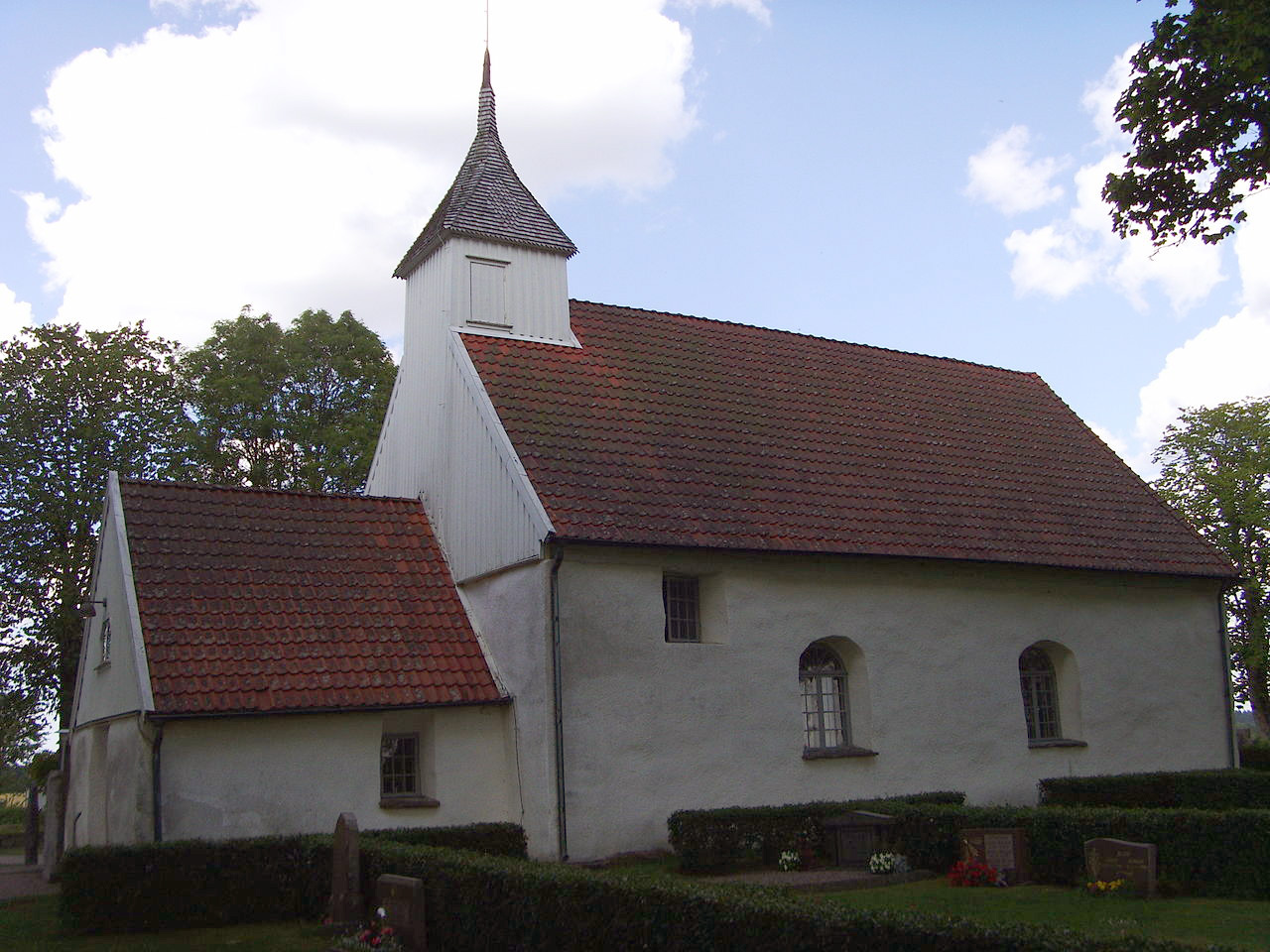
The church at Fölene, Sweden.

The Fölene Runestones are two Viking Age memorial runestones which are located near the church in Fölene, which is about 2 km (1.2 mi) west of Herrljunga, Västra Götaland County, Sweden, which was in the historic province of Västergötland. The stones are memorials to two men who were described as holding the title drengr.

== Vg 153 ==
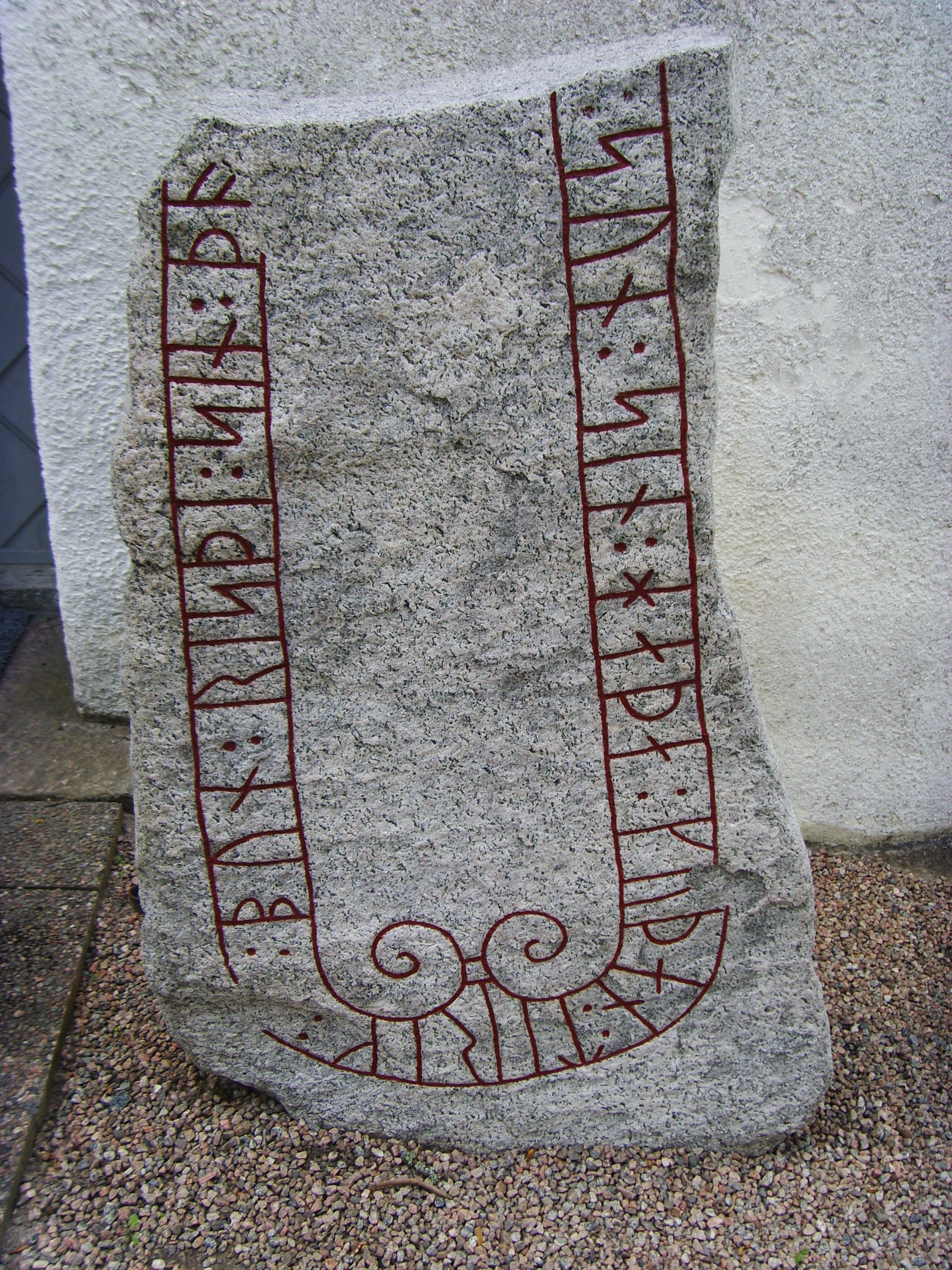
Runestone Vg 153.

Västergötland Runic Inscription 153 or Vg 153 is the Rundata catalog number for an inscription on a granite stone that is 1.6 meters in height. The inscription, which is missing its upper section, consists of runic text in a band along the edge of the stone. It is classified tentatively, due to the missing section, as being carved in runestone style RAK, which is the classification for inscriptions with text bands with straight ends that do not have any serpent or beast heads attached. The inscription was first noted with its damage in 1791 as being part of the foundation of the church wall. Before the historical significance of runestones was understood, they were often re-used as construction material for bridges, roads, and buildings such as churches. The stone was removed in 1937 and is located along with Vg 154 near the entrance to the church.

The runic text of Vg 153 states that it was raised by a man named Bjôrn as a memorial to his son, whose name was on the missing upper portion of the stone. The son is described as being harþa goþan dræng or "a very good valiant man", using the term drengr. A drengr in Denmark was a term mainly associated with members of a warrior group. It has been suggested that drengr along with thegn was first used as a title associated with men from Denmark and Sweden in service to Danish kings, but, from its context in inscriptions, over time became more generalized and was used by groups such as merchants or the crew of a ship. A similar phrase was used in the inscription on Vg 154. Other runestones describing the deceased using the words harþa goþan dræng in some order include DR 1 in Haddeby, DR 68 in Århus, DR 77 in Hjermind, DR 127 in Hobro, DR 268 in Östra Vemmenhög, DR 276 in Örsjö, DR 288 and DR 289 in Bjäresjö, Sm 48 in Torp, Vg 61 in Härlingstorp, Vg 90 in Torestorp, Vg 112 in Ås, Vg 114 in Börjesgården, the now-lost Vg 126 in Larvs, Vg 130 in Skånum, Vg 157 in Storegården, Vg 162 in Bengtsgården, Vg 179 in Lillegården, Vg 181 in Frugården, Vg 184 in Smula (using a plural form), the now-lost Ög 60 in Järmstastenen, Ög 104 in Gillberga, and possibly on U 610 in Granhammar.

=== Inscription ===
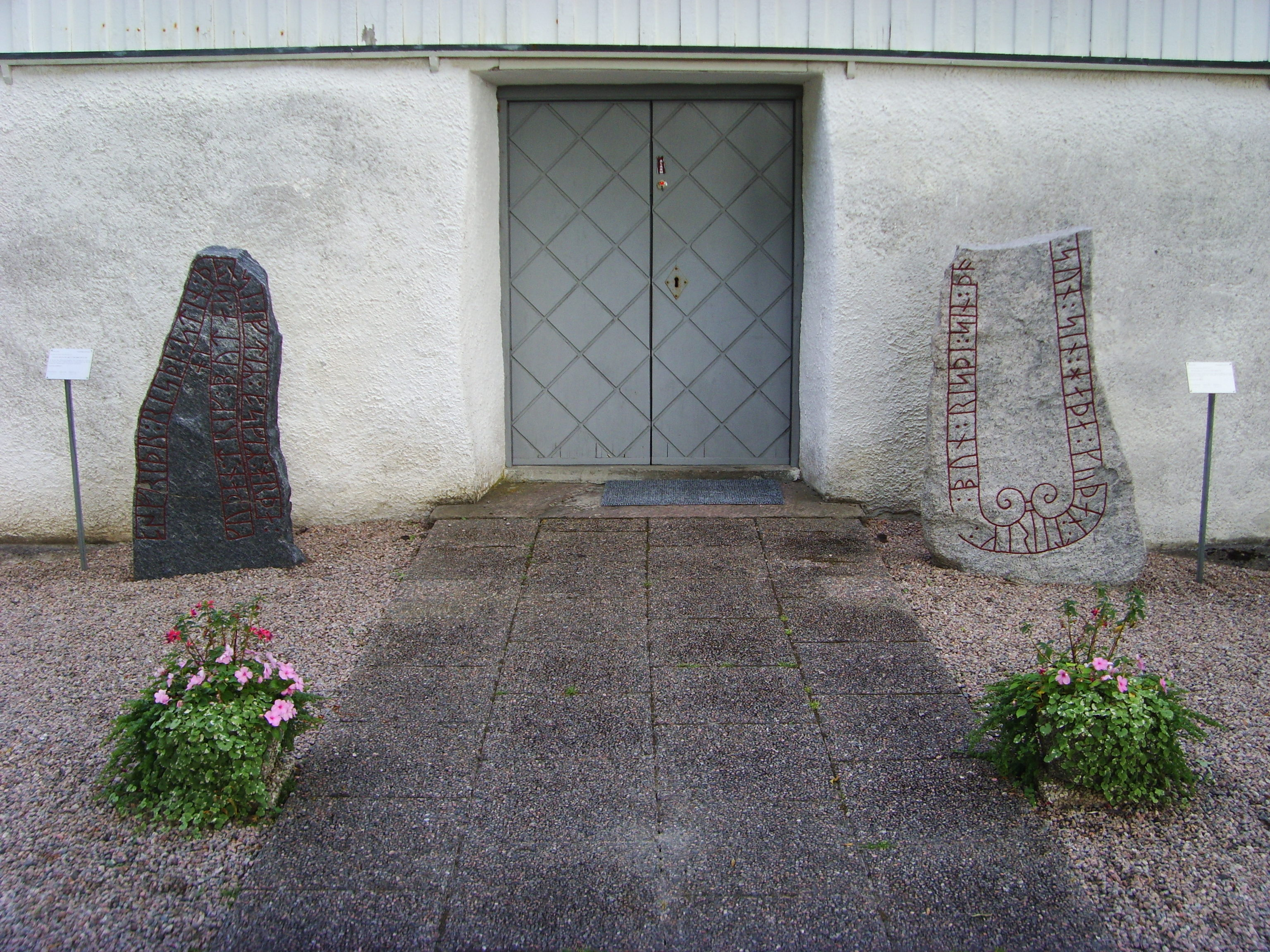
Vg 154 and Vg 153 at the entrance to the church.

==== Transliteration of the runes into Latin characters ====
: bun : risþi : sin : þo... ... : sun : sin : haþa : kuþan : tirik :

==== Transcription into Old Norse ====
Biorn ræisti stæin þa[nnsi] ..., sun sinn, harða goðan dræng.

==== Translation in English ====
Bjôrn raised this stone ... his son, a very good valiant man.

== Vg 154 ==
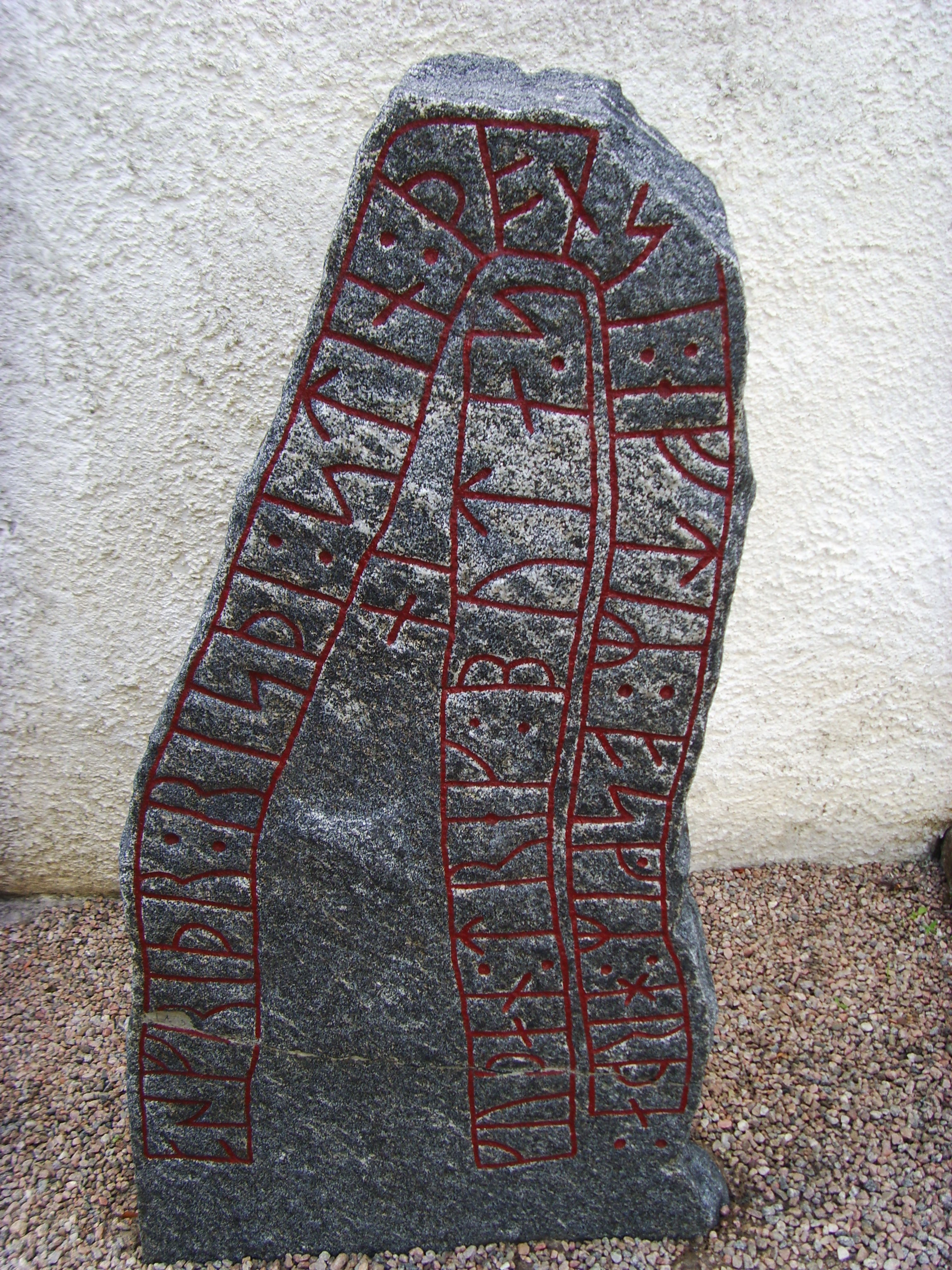
Runestone Vg 154.

Västergötland Runic Inscription 154 or Vg 154 is the Rundata designation of the second granite runestone at the church at Fölene. Made of granite and is 1.6 meters in height, the inscription is classified as being carved in runestone style RAK. It was discovered lying face down and broken in two pieces in the chancel wall during renovations to the church in 1946. The stone was repaired and placed near the entrance to the church.

The runic text of Vg 154 states that it was raised as a memorial by a woman named Ásfríðr in memory of her husband Ásgeirr. Similar to Vg 153, Ásgeirr holds the title drengr and is described as being harða goðan dræng or "a very good valiant man."

=== Inscription ===
==== Transliteration of the runes into Latin characters ====
osfriþr : risþi : stin : þonsi : eftiʀ : osgiʀ : hrþa : kuþan : trek : buta * sin

==== Transcription into Old Norse ====
Asfriðr ræisti stæin þannsi æftiʀ Asgæiʀ, harða goðan dræng, bonda sinn.

==== Translation in English ====
Ásfríðr raised this stone in memory of Ásgeirr, her husbandman, a very good valiant man.
