= Södermanland Runic Inscription 270 =

Coordinates: 59°10′04″N 18°14′11″E

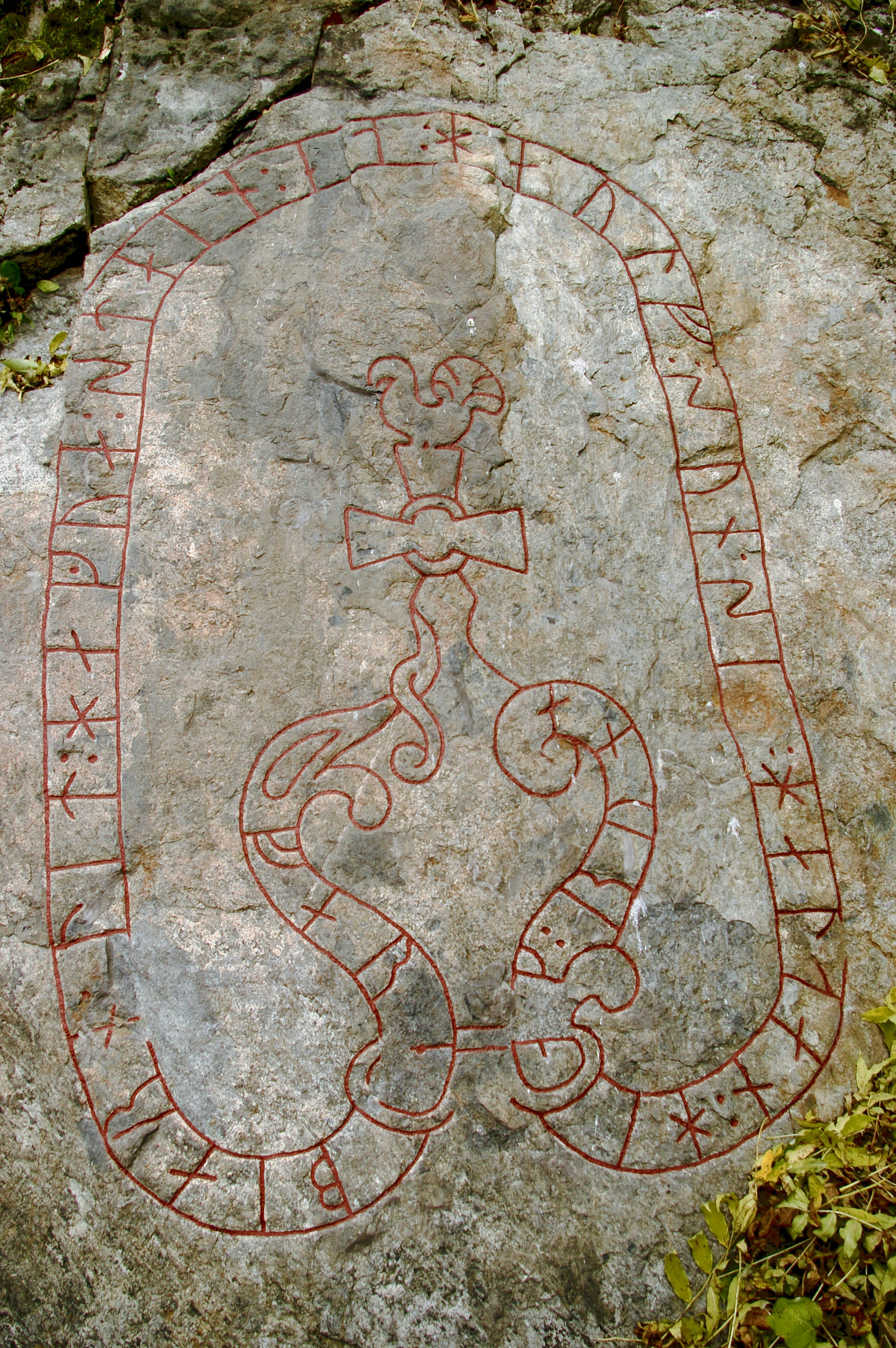
Sö 270 is located in Tyresta, Södermanland, Sweden.

Södermanland Runic Inscription 270 or Sö 270 is the Rundata catalog number for a Viking Age memorial runic inscription. It is located in Tyresta National Park, Tyresta, which is about two kilometers east of Brandbergen, Stockholm County, Sweden, which is in the historic province of Södermanland.

== Description ==
This runic inscription is carved into a gneiss rockface and is about 1.65 meters in height. It consists of runic text on a serpent that surrounds a Christian cross with a bird on top of it. This bird has been interpreted as being a cock. Placed on a cross, the cock would be interpreted as a Christian symbol meaning rebirth and vigilance, similar to weathercocks that are on top of churches today. A similar depiction of a bird on a cross is on the runestone fragment Sö 245 in Tungelsta. The head and tail of the serpent on Sö 270 are shown bound as if to prevent it from leaving the surface of the stone. The inscription is classified as being carved in either runestone style Pr3 or Pr4, which is also known as Urnes style. This runestone style is characterized by slim and stylized animals that are interwoven into tight patterns. The animal heads are typically seen in profile with slender almond-shaped eyes and upwardly curled appendages on the noses and the necks.

The runic text is in the younger futhark and states that the inscription is a memorial by a father named either Farbjôrn or Freybjôrn for his son Háulfr. If the father's name is Freybjôrn, it would contain the Norse pagan god Freyr as a theophoric name element and mean "Freyr Bear." The text also states that the inscription was carved by a runemaster named Halfdan, which is normalized as Halvdan. Although over fifteen other runestones in Södermanland have been attributed for stylistic reasons to this runemaster, this is the only surviving inscription that was signed by him. The other inscriptions listed in Rundata that are attributed to Halvdan based upon stylistic analysis include Sö 235 in Västerby, Sö 237 in Fors, Sö 239 in Häringe, Sö 244 in Tuna, Sö 245 in Tungelsta, the now-lost Sö 247 in Ålsta, Sö 252 in Säby, Sö 256 in Älby, Sö 262 in Blista, Sö 269 in Söderby Malm, Sö 272 in Upp-Norrby, Sö 274 in Södersluss, Sö 290 in Farsta, Sö 292 in Bröta, Sö 297 in Uppinge, Sö 298 in Uringe Malm, and Sö 301 in Ågesta Bro. For this inscription, Halvdan used a punctuation mark usually consisting of two dots between each word in the runic text.

== Inscription ==
=== Transliteration of the runes into Latin characters ===
far(e)biarn : lit : hagua : stain : et : haulf : sun * si- : hal(t)an : hiak : runa

=== Transcription into Old Norse ===
Farbjôrn/Freybjôrn lét hôggva stein at Háulf, son si[nn]. Halfdan hjó rúnar.

=== Translation in English ===
Farbjôrn/Freybjôrn had the stone cut in memory of Háulfr, his son. Halfdan cut the runes.
