= Västergötland Runic Inscription 90 =

Coordinates: 58.2429°N 13.6014°E

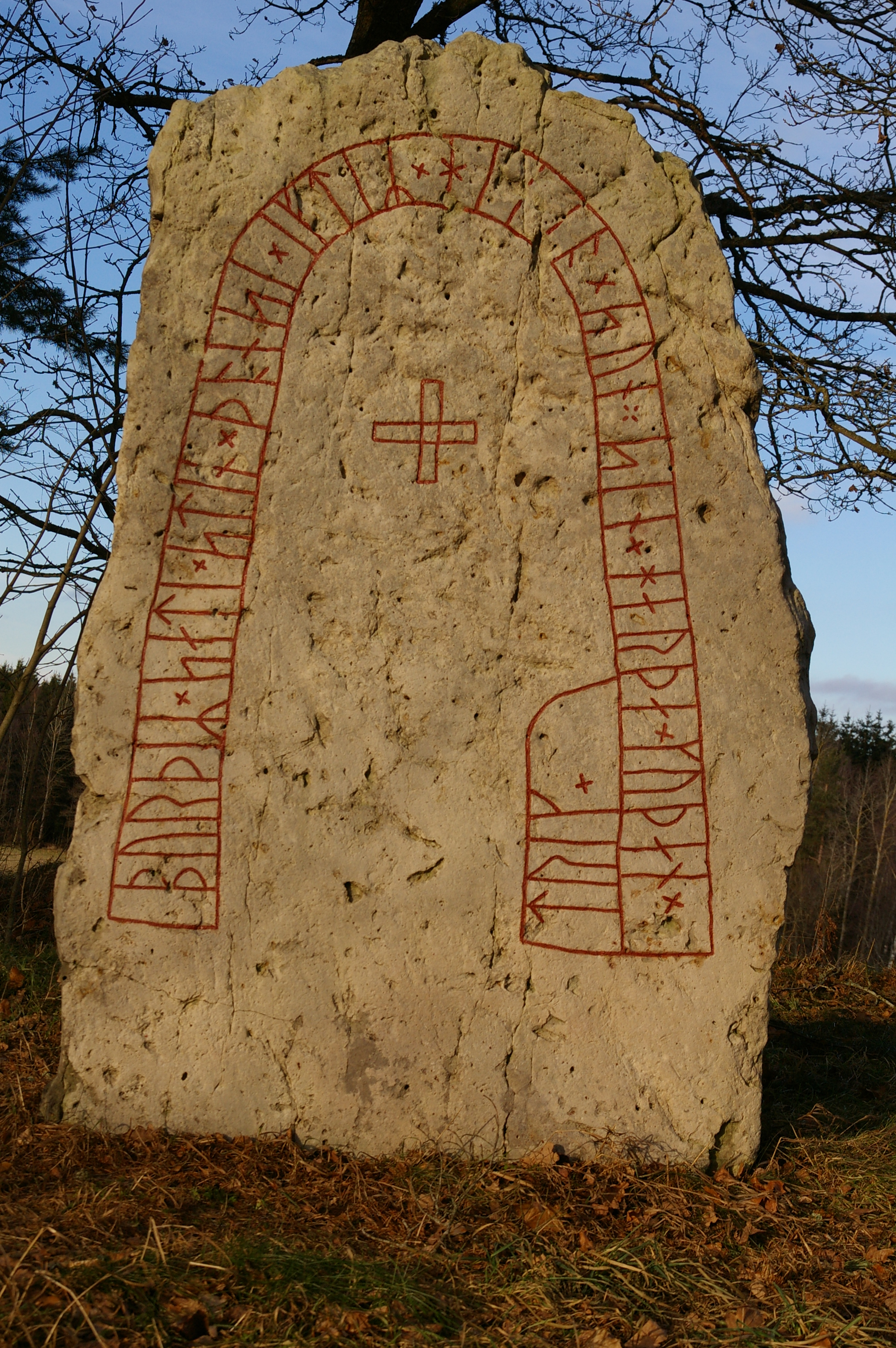
Vg 90 in Torestorp.

Västergötland Runic Inscription 90 or Vg 90 is the Rundata listing for a Viking Age memorial runestone located in Torestorp, which is about three kilometers northwest of Gudhem, Västra Götaland County, Sweden, and in the historic province of Västergötland.

== Description ==
The inscription on Vg 90 consists of runes carved in the younger futhark in a text band that forms an arch that then curves back in the interior for one word. A small cross is in the upper part of the interior. The stone, which is made of limestone and is 2.1 meters in height, is classified as being carved in runestone style RAK, which is considered to be the oldest style. This is the classification where the ends of the text bands are straight and do not have any attached serpent or beast heads. The runestone, which is located on a natural hill, was noted in a letter written by King Magnus Ladulås in 1287. This is believed to be the first modern notice of the existence of runestones in Sweden. The unnamed runemaster who carved Vg 90 is also believed to have carved inscription Vg 85 in Stora Dala.

The runic text states that the stone was raised by a man named Bróðir as a memorial for a son whose name cannot be clearly determined. The deceased son is described as being harða goðan dræng or "a very good valiant man," using the term drengr. A drengr in Denmark was a term mainly associated with members of a warrior group. It has been suggested that drengr along with thegn was first used as a title associated with men from Denmark and Sweden in service to Danish kings, but, from its context in inscriptions, over time became more generalized and was used by groups such as merchants or the crew of a ship. Other runestones describing the deceased using the words harþa goþan dræng in some order include DR 1 in Haddeby, DR 68 in Århus, DR 77 in Hjermind, DR 127 in Hobro, DR 268 in Östra Vemmenhög, DR 276 in Örsjö, DR 288 and DR 289 in Bjäresjö, Sm 48 in Torp, Vg 61 in Härlingstorp, Vg 112 in Ås, Vg 114 in Börjesgården, the now-lost Vg 126 in Larvs, Vg 130 in Skånum, Vg 153 and Vg 154 in Fölene, Vg 157 in Storegården, Vg 162 in Bengtsgården, Vg 179 in Lillegården, Vg 181 in Frugården, Vg 184 in Smula (using a plural form), the now-lost Ög 60 in Järmstastenen, Ög 104 in Gillberga, and possibly on U 610 in Granhammar. On Vg 90, the runes trik for "drengr" have been emphasized by their placement on the portion of the text band that bends back in the interior, although one scholar has suggested that this arrangement may have been caused by "faulty planning" on the part of the runemaster. If the name of the father is correctly read as Bróðir, the runemaster spelled the name as burþiʀ using a reverse-read "ur." A punctuation mark consisting of a × was used as a word divider between each word of the runic text.

== Inscription ==
=== Transliteration of the runes into Latin characters ===
burþiʀ × sati × stin × þonsi × iftiʀ × h(i)--o × sun × sin × harþa × kuþan × trik ×

=== Transcription into Old Norse ===
Broðiʀ satti stæin þannsi æftiʀ <hi--o>, sun sinn, harða goðan dræng.

=== Translation in English ===
Bróðir placed this stone in memory of <hi--o> his son, a very good valiant man.
