= Bjärsjöholm Castle =

Castle in Scania, Sweden

- Bjärsjöholm slott
- Ystad Municipality
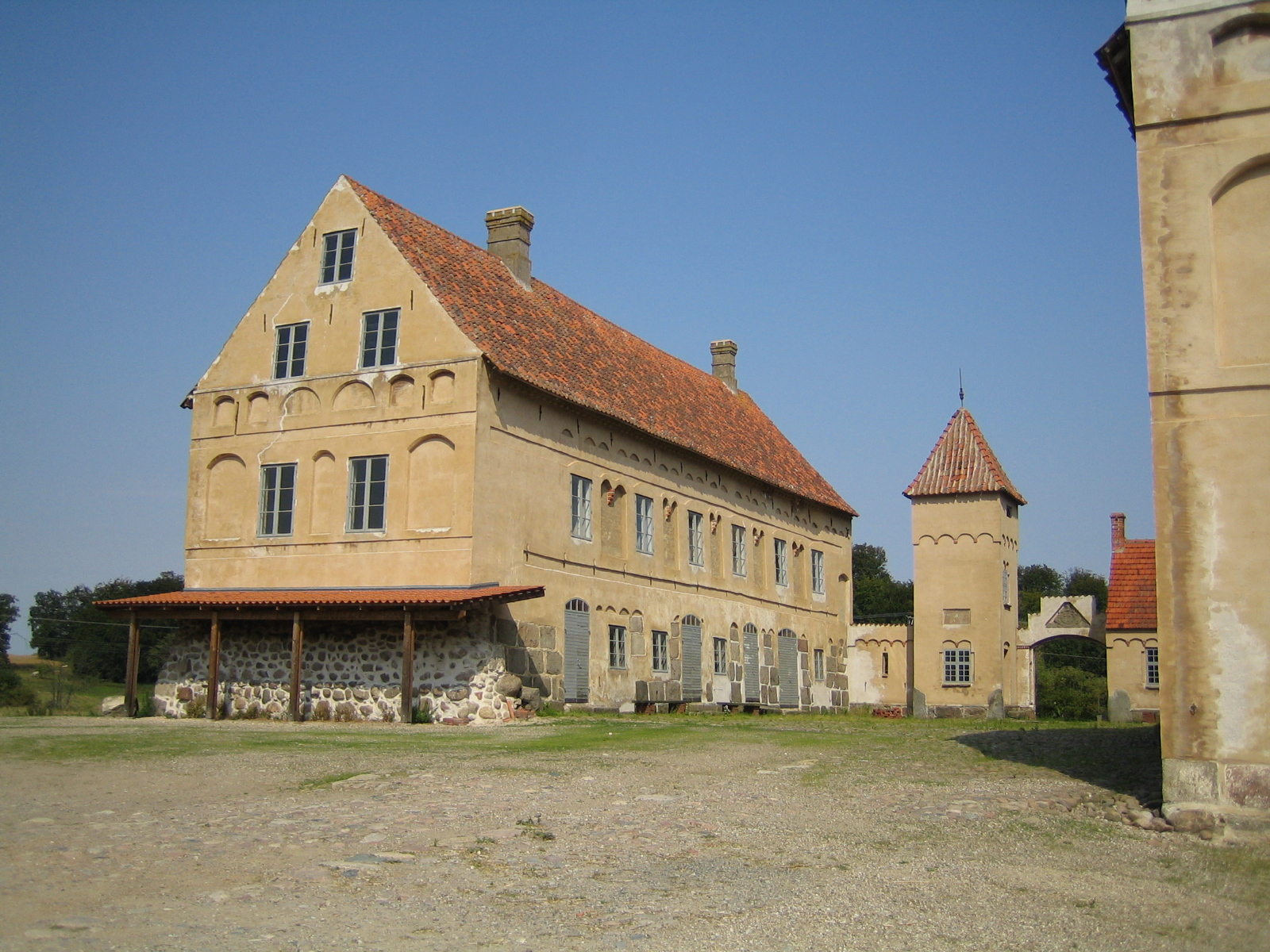
- Bjärsjöholm from 1576

Site information
- Type: Castle
- Open to the public: Yes (Renaissance castle)

Location
- Scania Sweden
- Location within Skåne
- Coordinates: 55°27′13″N 13°46′39″E

Site history
- Built: 14th century

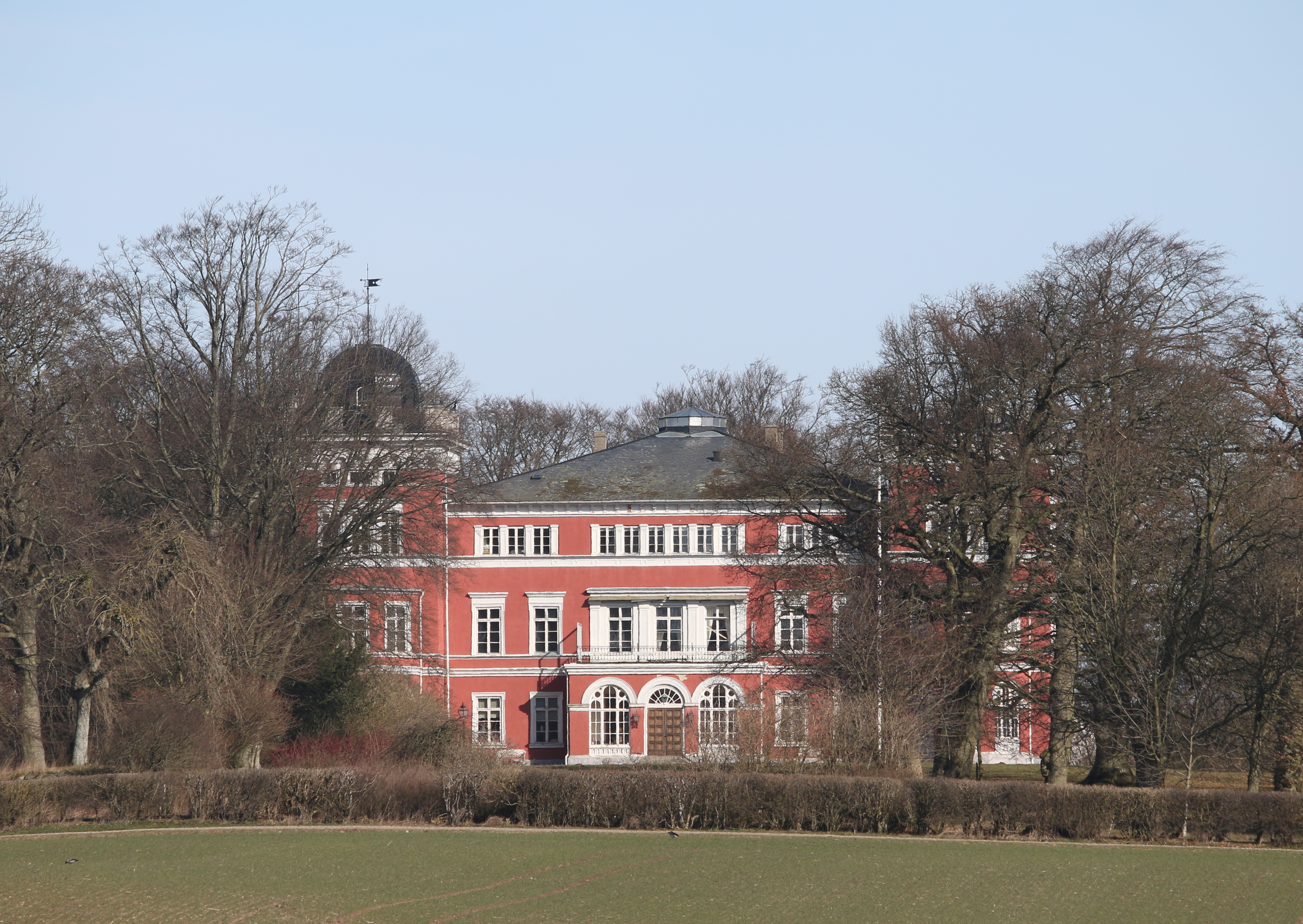
Bjärsjöholm from 1850

Bjärsjöholm Castle or Bjersjöholm Castle (Swedish: Bjärsjoholm slott or Bjersjöholm slott) is a manor dating from the 16th century, northwest of Ystad in Scania, Sweden. Originally consisting of four brick buildings built around a courtyard, the present manor consists of two buildings.

To the north is the original Renaissance style manor from 1576, built by Björn Kaas. It was abandoned due to settlements. A new manor was designed by Ferdinand Meldahl (1827–1908) was built in 1850. The newer addition on the estate was built in Romantic, German style in 1849–50, on a hill just south of the old manor. It is a three-story building flanked by two square towers. In 1890, one of the Renaissance buildings needed extensive renovations and only the gables could be saved.

== See also ==
- Bjäresjö Runestones
