= Bjäresjö Runestones =

Three Viking Age runestones in Sweden

Coordinates: 55°27′44″N 13°44′59″E

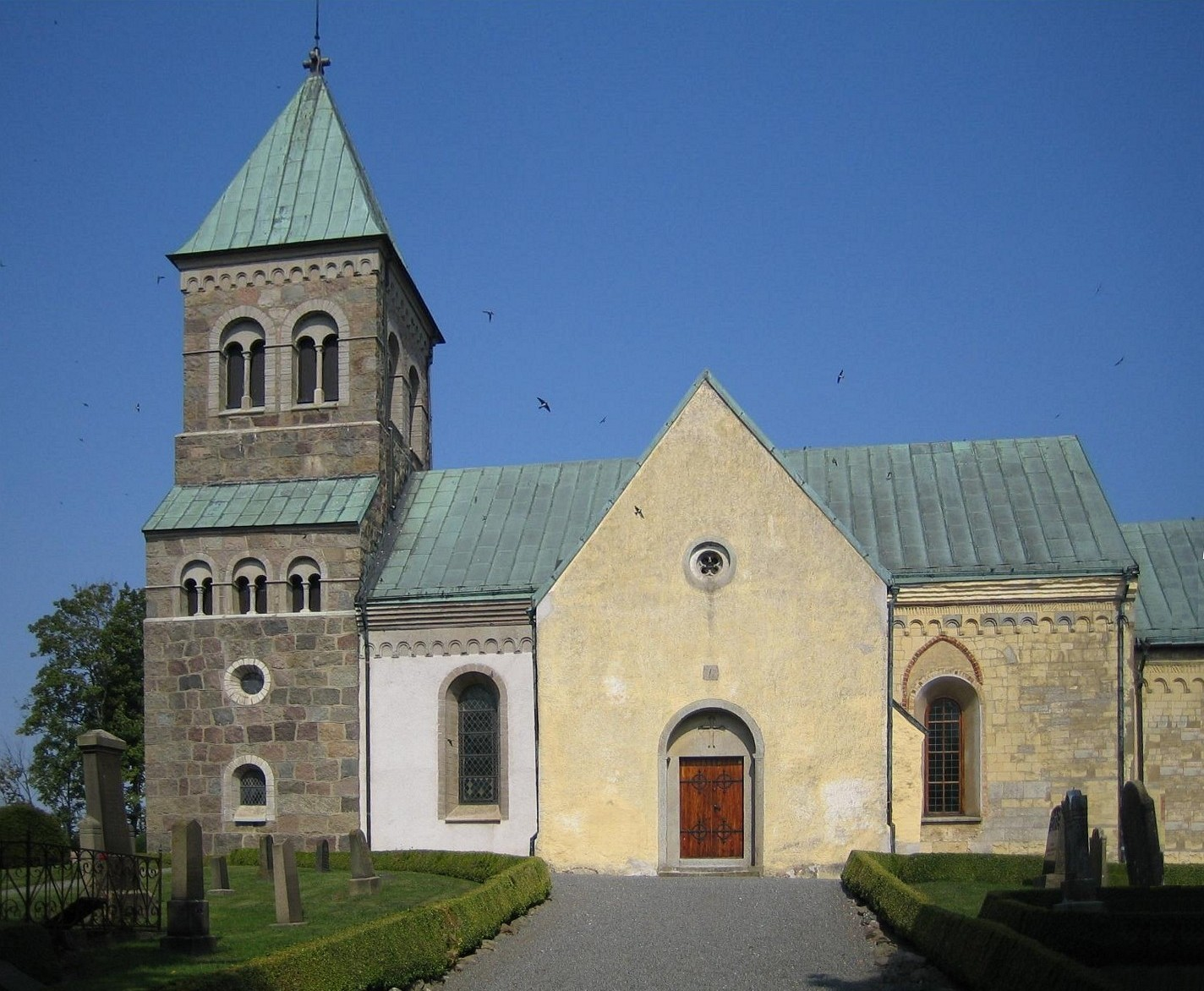
Bjäresjö Church

The Bjäresjö Runestones are three Viking Age memorial runestones originally located adjacent to Bjäresjö Church in Bjäresjö, which is about 3 kilometers northwest of Ystad, Skåne County, Sweden. Two of the stones were discovered near the church, and two of the stones have been moved to other nearby locations. Although these three stones are located in Sweden, they have been given Danish DR-designations (DR 287-289) because Scania was part of the historic Denmark.

== DR 287 ==
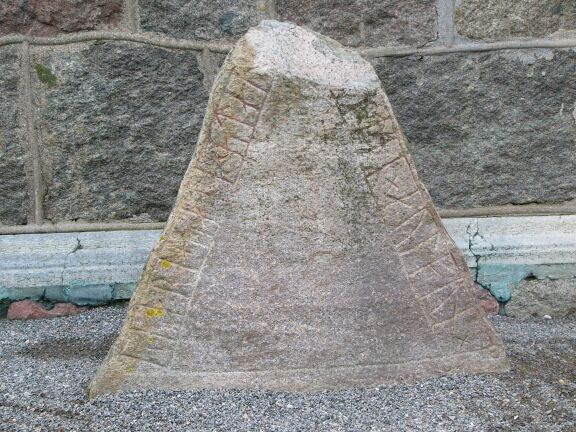
DR 287 near the church in Bjäresjö.

Bjäresjö 1, which is listed in the Rundata catalog as DR 287, which is 0.99 meters in height and made of granite, is triangular shaped stone with the upper portion missing. The inscription on the stone consists of a runic band that follows the edge of the stone. The inscription is classified as being carved in runestone style RAK, which is the classification for text bands that have straight ends without any serpent or beast heads attached. Known since 1627, the stone was originally located in a wall of the cemetery. Before the historic significance of runestones was understood, they were often reused as materials in the construction of roads, walls, and buildings such as churches. The stone was moved in 1994 near the church tower to prevent it from being damaged from activities such as snow removal. Based upon comparative stylistic analysis, the inscription is dated as being carved from about 970 to 1020 CE, with the earlier date based upon the inscription being made after the erection of the Jelling Stones.

The runic text states that the stone is a memorial raised by a man named Kári in memory of a man named either Alfvin or Ôlfun. The runemaster used an × punctuation mark as a word divider for each word of the text.

=== Inscription ===
==== Transliteration of the runes into Latin characters ====
× kari × sati × stain ... uftiʀ × aulfun ×

==== Transcription into Old Norse ====
Kari satti sten ... æftiʀ Olfun(?)/Alfwin(?).

==== Translation in English ====
Kári placed the stone ... in memory of Alfvin(?)/Ôlfun(?)

== DR 288 ==
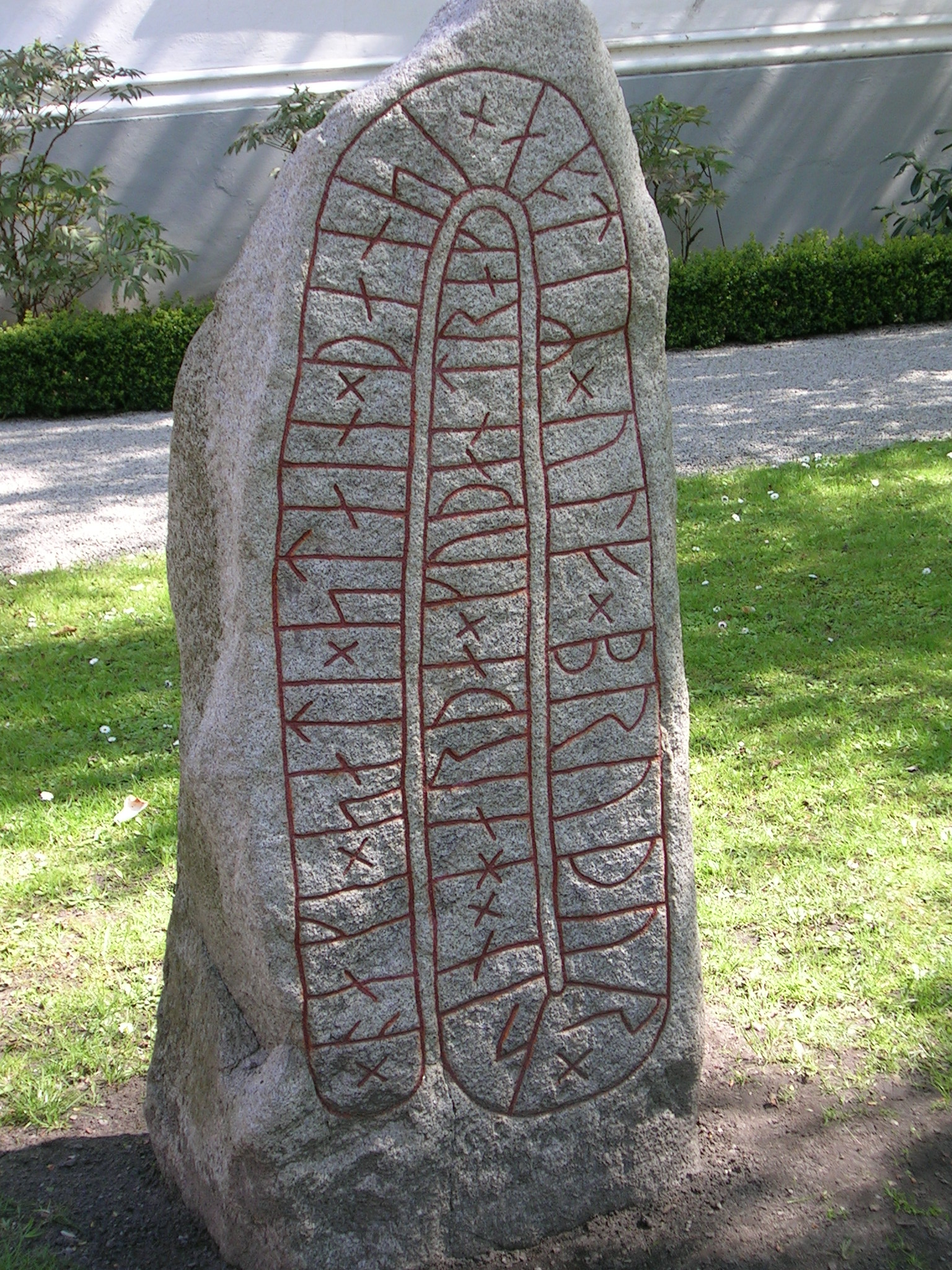
DR 288 at the Kulturen in Lund.

Bjäresjö 2, which is listed in the Rundata catalog as DR 288, has a runic text band that curves into three vertical rows. The granite stone is 1.7 meters in height and the inscription is classified as being carved in runestone style RAK. The stone has been known since 1627. Originally located near the church at Bjäresjö, the stone was first moved to Ruthsbo, which is about five kilometers west of Ystad, and then to the Marvinsholm Park. In 1913 it was moved to the grounds of the Kulturen, a museum in Lund. Based upon comparative stylistic analysis, the inscription is dated as being carved between 970 and 1020 CE.

The runic text states that a man named Áki raised the stone as a memorial to his brother Ulfr. Similar to the Bjäresjö 1 inscription, the runemaster on DR 288 used an × punctuation mark as a word divider. Ulfr is described as being harþa goþan dræng or "a very good valent man," using the term drengr. A drengr in Denmark was a term mainly associated with members of a warrior group. It has been suggested that drengr along with thegn was first used as a title associated with men from Denmark and Sweden in service to Danish kings, but, from its context in inscriptions, over time became more generalized and was used by groups such as merchants or the crew of a ship. A similar phrase was used in the inscription on Bjäresjö 3. Other runestones describing the deceased using the words harþa goþan dræng in some order include DR 1 in Haddeby, DR 68 in Århus, DR 77 in Hjermind, DR 127 in Hobro, DR 268 in Östra Vemmenhög, DR 276 in Örsjö, Sm 48 in Torp, Vg 61 in Härlingstorp, Vg 90 in Torestorp, Vg 112 in Ås, Vg 114 in Börjesgården, the now-lost Vg 126 in Larvs, Vg 130 in Skånum, Vg 153 and Vg 154 in Fölene, Vg 157 in Storegården, Vg 162 in Bengtsgården, Vg 179 in Lillegården, Vg 181 in Frugården, Vg 184 in Smula (using a plural form), the now-lost Ög 60 in Järmstastenen, Ög 104 in Gillberga, and possibly on U 610 in Granhammar.

=== Inscription ===
==== Transliteration of the runes into Latin characters ====
× oaki × sati × stain × þansi × aftiʀ × ulf × bruþur × sin × harþa × kuþan × trak ×

==== Transcription into Old Norse ====
Aki satti sten þænsi æftiʀ Ulf, broþur sin, harþa goþan dræng.

==== Translation in English ====
Áki placed this stone in memory of Ulfr, his brother, a very good valiant man.

== DR 289 ==
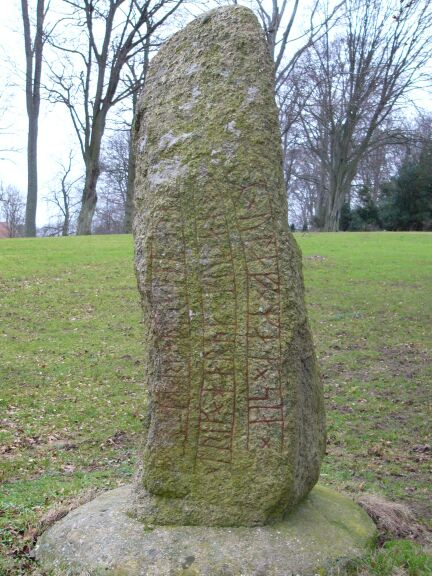
DR 289 is in Bjärsjöholm.

Bjäresjö 3, which is listed in the Rundata catalog as DR 289, is a granite stone 1.9 meters in height and has an inscription consisting of runic text that bends into three vertical rows. The inscription is classified as being carved in runestone style RAK. The stone was discovered 27 July 1845 by Professor P. G. Thorsson in a field at Bjärsjöholm, a manor house, and is now located at the Bjärsjöskolans park, which is south of the Bjärsjöholm Castle. Based on comparative stylistic analysis, the inscription is dated as being carved between 970 and 1020 CE.

The text on DR 289 indicates that the stone was raised by a man named either Fraði or Freði as a memorial to an in-law named Ólafr. Similar to the text of DR 288, the deceased is described as being dræng harþa goþan meaning a "very good valiant man" and uses the same term drengr. The text also uses an × punctuation mark as a word divider.

=== Inscription ===
==== Transliteration of the runes into Latin characters ====
fraþi × risþi × st(e)n × þansi × aftiʀ × ulaf × mak × sia × ¶ × trek × harþa × kuþan ×

==== Transcription into Old Norse ====
Fraþi/Fræþi resþi sten þænsi æftiʀ Olaf, mag sin, dræng harþa goþan.

==== Translation in English ====
Fraði/Freði raised this stone in memory of Ólafr, his kinsman-by-marriage, a very good valiant man.
