= Halvdan (runemaster) =

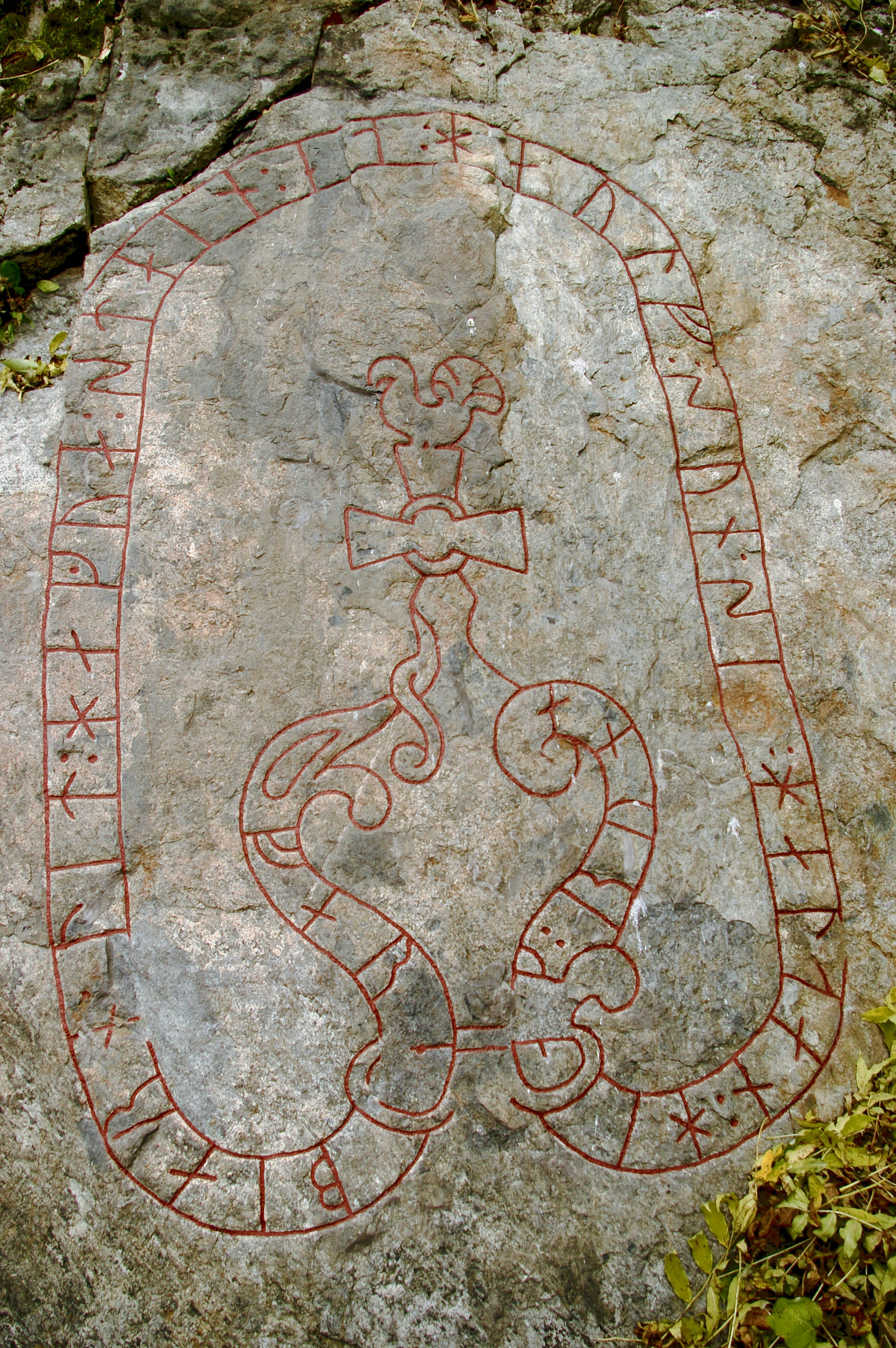
Inscription Sö 270 was signed by Halvdan as hal(t)an on the lower right portion of the serpent.

Halvdan, normalized from Old Norse Halfdan, was a runemaster in mid-11th century Södermanland, Sweden.

== Career ==
Most early medieval Scandinavians were probably literate in runes, and most people probably carved messages on pieces of bone and wood. However, it was difficult to make runestones, and in order to master it one also needed to be a stonemason. During the 11th century, when most runestones were raised, there were a few professional runemasters. The runemaster Halvdan is known by name because he signed the inscription Sö 270 in Tyresta. Halvdan often did work that has been classified as being carved in runestone style Pr3, which is also known as Urnes style. This runestone style is characterized by slim and stylized animals that are interwoven into tight patterns, with the animal heads typically seen in profile with slender almond-shaped eyes and upwardly curled appendages on the noses and the necks. Over fifteen other runestones have been attributed to him. The other inscriptions listed in Rundata that are attributed to Halvdan based upon stylistic analysis include Sö 235 in Västerby, Sö 237 in Fors, Sö 239 in Häringe, Sö 244 in Tuna, Sö 245 in Tungelsta, the now-lost Sö 247 in Ålsta, Sö 252 in Säby, Sö 256 in Älby, Sö 262 in Blista, Sö 269 in Söderby Malm, Sö 272 in Upp-Norrby, Sö 274 in Södersluss, Sö 290 in Farsta, Sö 292 in Bröta, Sö 297 in Uppinge, Sö 298 in Uringe Malm, and Sö 301 in Ågesta Bro. In most of his inscriptions, Halvdan used a punctuation mark to separate each word in the runic text.
