= Landfjärden =

- Location within Stockholm Location within Sweden
- Coordinates: 59°02′N 17°59′E
- Country: Sweden
- Province: Södermanland
- County: Stockholm County
- Municipality: Nynäshamn Municipality

Area
  - Total: 1.10 km^{2} (0.42 sq mi)

Population (31 December 2020)
  - Total: 280
  - Density: 250/km^{2} (660/sq mi)
- Time zone: UTC+1 (CET)
  - Summer (DST): UTC+2 (CEST)

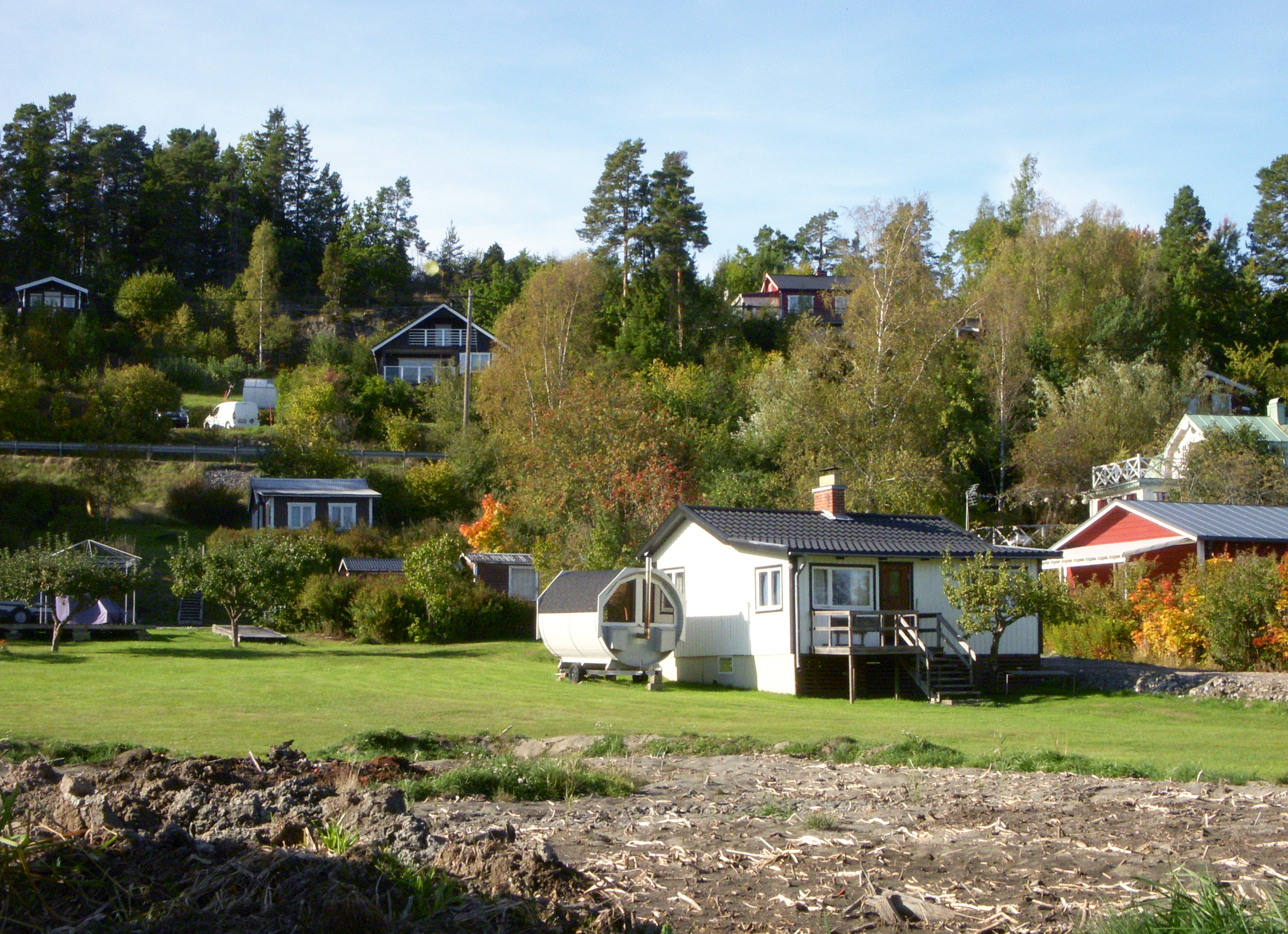
Landfjärden in 2014

Landfjärden is a locality situated in Nynäshamn Municipality, Stockholm County, Sweden with 241 inhabitants in 2010.
