= Félag =

Joint financial venture between partners in Viking Age society

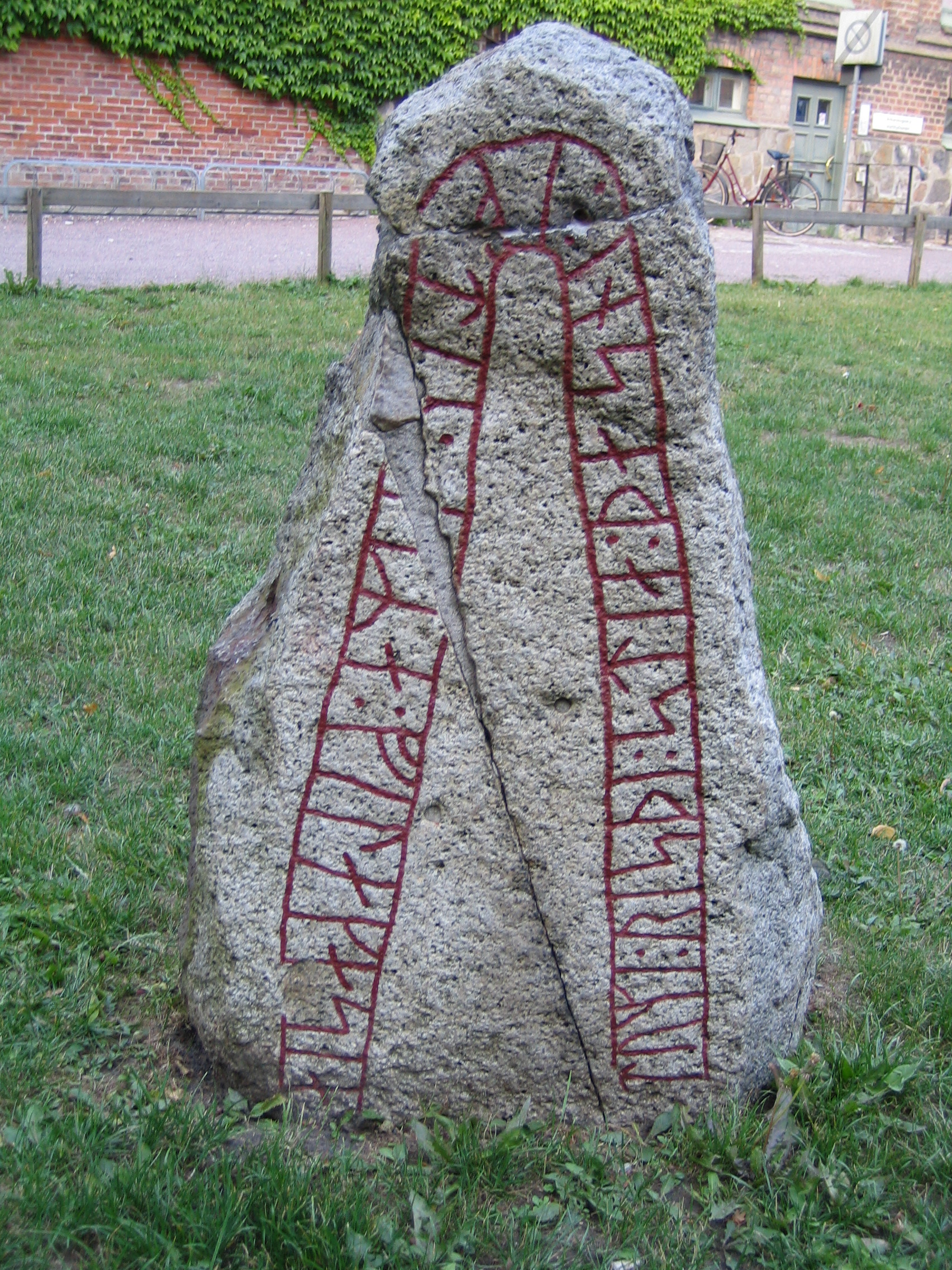
DR 270 in Scania, modern Sweden, is one of several runestones that were raised in commemoration of someone's félagi.

Félag (Old Norse, meaning "fellowship, partnership") was a joint financial venture between partners in Viking Age society.

== Etymology ==
The word félag is constructed by the word fé (cattle, wealth) and a verbal base denoting "lay", the meaning being "to lay property together."

The Old Norse word félagi "companion, comrade" originally meaning "one who has félag with another" has resulted in the modern English word fellow from Old English feolaga, Danish fælle from Old Danish felge, and Norwegian felle.

The modern English word fellowship derives from the Old Norse félag stem, adding the -ship suffix as a "condition of being", cognate with Icelandic félagskap. The word also exists in other Germanic languages; Norwegian fellesskap, and Danish fællesskab.

== Runic inscriptions ==
The term félag is mentioned on a broad range of runic inscriptions, most notably in the form félagi (see etymology section), in these contexts meaning "comrade", "weapon brother" or "partner". Runestones that use a form of the term félag include Sö 292 in Bröta, Vg 112 in Ås, Vg 122 in Abrahamstorp, the now-lost Vg 146 in Slöta, Vg 182 in Skattegården, U 391 in Villa Karlsro, the now-lost U 954 in Söderby, DR 1 in Haddeby, DR 66 and DR 68 in Århus, DR 125 in Dalbyover, DR 127 in Hobro, DR 262 in Fosie, DR 270 in Skivarp, DR 279 in Sjörup, DR 316 in Norra Nöbbelöv, DR 318 in Håstad, DR 321 in Västra Karaby, DR 329 and DR 330 in Gårdstånga, DR 339 in Stora Köpinge, and X UaFv1914;47 in Berezanj, Ukraina.

=== N 648 ===
Félag is mentioned on N 648, a runekjevle (cylinder shaped piece of wood with a smooth side for the runes) excavated in Bergen. The inscription dates back to the early fourteenth century. The inscription speaks of Þórir the Fair who greets his félagi Hafgrímr, and requests his partner to help him in need.

== See also ==
- Fe rune
