= Berezan' Runestone =

Runestone discovered in Berezan, Ukraine

Coordinates: 46°36′00″N 31°24′36″E

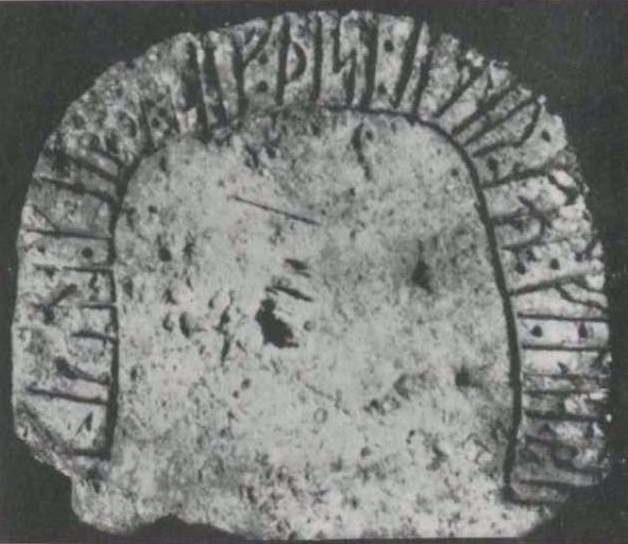
The Beresan Runestone.

The Beresan Runestone (X UaFv1914;47) was discovered in 1905 by Ernst von Stern, professor at Odessa, on the Beresan Island (also known as the Island of Saint Aetherius) where the Dnieper River meets the Black Sea. The runestone is 48 cm (19 in) wide, 47 cm (19 in) high and 12 cm (4.7 in) thick, and is kept in the museum of Odessa. It was made by a Varangian (Viking) trader named Grani in memory of his business partner Karl. They were probably from Gotland, Sweden.

== Location ==
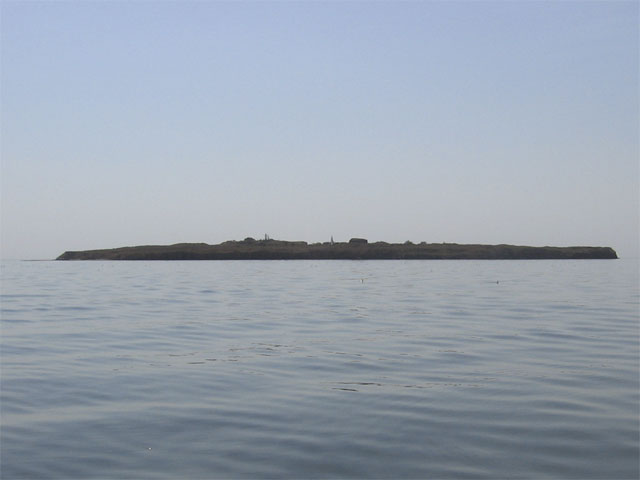
The island.

Berezan' is located in the Black Sea not far from the mouth of the Dnieper River. Its bays gave shelter to the Scandinavian ships that passed it on the trade route from the Varangians to the Greeks. Sven B.F. Jansson, later Sweden's National Antiquarian, writes on its importance:

When the traveller came from the north, with the perils of the Dniepr cataracts (mentioned on the Pilgård stone) and the difficulties of sandbanks and treacherous shoal-water still fresh in his memory, he came at last, here by Berezanj, to open water, where the Black Sea, bigger than the Baltic, opened up before his ship's prow. And when he came to Berezanj from the south - on his way to the thick-wooded creeks of Mälaren or the stony havens of Gotland - he could gather strength here before being forced to bend back and oar in the long struggle against the river currents and all the other obstacles in his way. Soon enough the time would come for the unloading and the dragging over the portages and the reloading, all in the sticky heat of the interior, hardly relieved by the steppe winds and the summer rain.

== Discovery ==
The runestone was discovered during the excavations of a kurgan from the 6th century BC. After its construction, the kurgan had been used for 48 additional burials of different types and at various depths. None of the bodies appeared to have been incinerated; some had been carelessly buried without any grave goods, while others had received wooden coffins or had at least been put on planks before the inhumation, while some had been inserted into stone coffins made of flat slabs of stone. On June 9, 1905, von Stern's crew discovered a lidless stone coffin in the eastern part of the kurgan containing a skeleton whose skull was resting on the runestone. The runestone was discovered by von Stern just as a worker intended to throw it on a pile of stone. The runestone was probably not discovered in its original location, and it is likely that it was originally located at one of the minor barrows in the vicinity.

== Inscription ==
The inscription is completely preserved, which is shown by the fact that the first and last letters are marked as the end parts of the inscription. The engravings are c. 8 cm long and 0.75 cm deep.

Transliteration and transcription:

krani : kerþi : (h)alf : þisi : iftir : kal : fi:laka : si(n)
Grani {} gærði {} hvalf {} þessi {} æftiʀ {} Karl, {} felaga {} sinn.
"Grani made this vault in memory of Karl, his partner."

== Identity ==
It is difficult to determine from where Grani and Karl came. In runic inscriptions, the Old Norse word hvalf ("vault", "coffin") only appears in Gotland, and in some late inscriptions from Västergötland (both being regions in present-day Sweden). There are no special traits in the inscription that suggests that it was written in the Old Gutnish dialect of Old Norse, but the shape of the runestone and its placement are usually found on Gotland.

It is likely that the Gotlanders Grani and Karl were on their way to, or from, Constantinople but that Karl died and so Grani prepared his last resting place on an island that had always been visited by sailors, and which the Byzantines called the "island of Saint Etherius."

The runestone's description of Karl as the félag of Grani indicates that they were operating in a mercantile partnership, but it has been suggested that it could have referred to them as members of the same retinue.

== Uniqueness ==
Few runic inscriptions have been discovered in Eastern Europe because stone material was scarce. It may also have been due to the tradition of inscribing runes on wooden poles that were erected on the barrows, something which was described by Ibn Fadlan who met Scandinavians on the shores of the Volga. By the time the raising of runestones became fashionable in the 11th century, most Scandinavian settlers in Russia, Belarus and Ukraine had been assimilated by the Slavic majority, and the influx of new settlers had ceased.

== See also ==
- Greece Runestones
- Italy Runestones
- Piraeus Lion
- Runic inscriptions in Hagia Sophia
- Trade route from the Varangians to the Greeks
- Varangian runestones
