= Väländan =

- Location within Stockholm Location within Sweden Location within European Union
- Coordinates: 59°07′N 18°00′E
- Country: Sweden
- Province: Södermanland
- County: Stockholm County
- Municipality: Haninge Municipality

Area
  - Total: 1.18 km^{2} (0.46 sq mi)

Population (31 December 2020)
  - Total: 557
  - Density: 472/km^{2} (1,220/sq mi)
- Time zone: UTC+1 (CET)
  - Summer (DST): UTC+2 (CEST)

Väländan is a locality situated in Haninge Municipality, Stockholm County, Sweden with 469 inhabitants in 2010.
