= Hedeby stones =

Archeological site in Germany

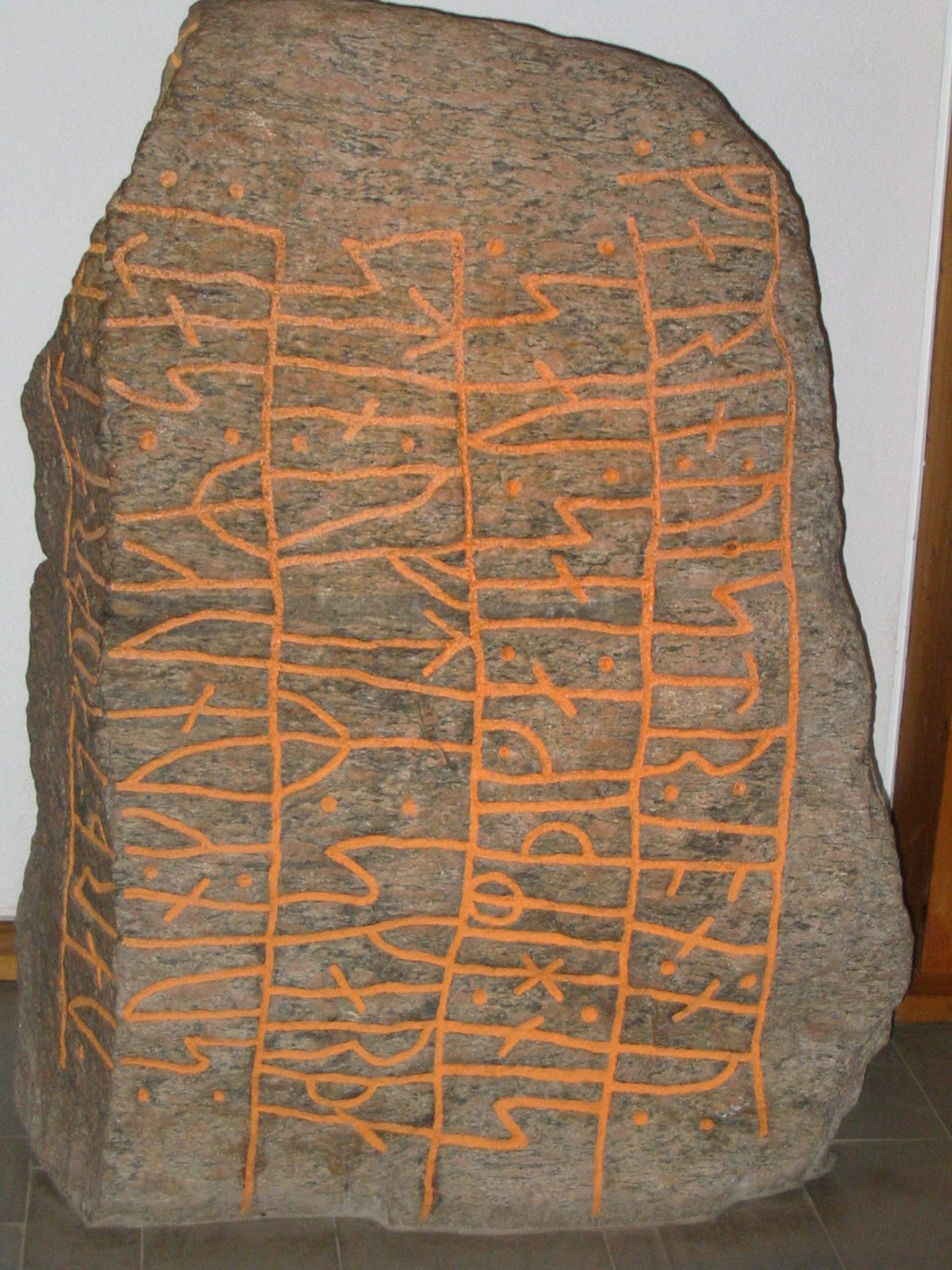
The Skarthi Stone DR 3.

The Hedeby stones are four runestones from the 10th century found at the town of Hedeby in Northern Germany. This area was part of Denmark during the Viking Age.

== Stone of Eric ==
The Stone of Eric (cataloged as Hedeby 1 or DR 1 under the Rundata system) was found in 1796 at Danevirke and moved to a park in Schleswig. Like the Skarthi Stone, it is believed to have been raised around 995, the year when Hedeby was attacked by the Swedish king Eric the Victorious who took advantage of the fact that Sweyn Forkbeard was campaigning in England.

== Sigtrygg Runestones ==
The big Sigtrygg Stone (Hedeby 2 or DR 2) was found in 1797 in Hedeby, and the small Sigtrygg Stone (Hedeby 4 or DR 4) was found in 1887. The Sigtrygg Stones was raised around the year 938.

== Skarthi Stone ==
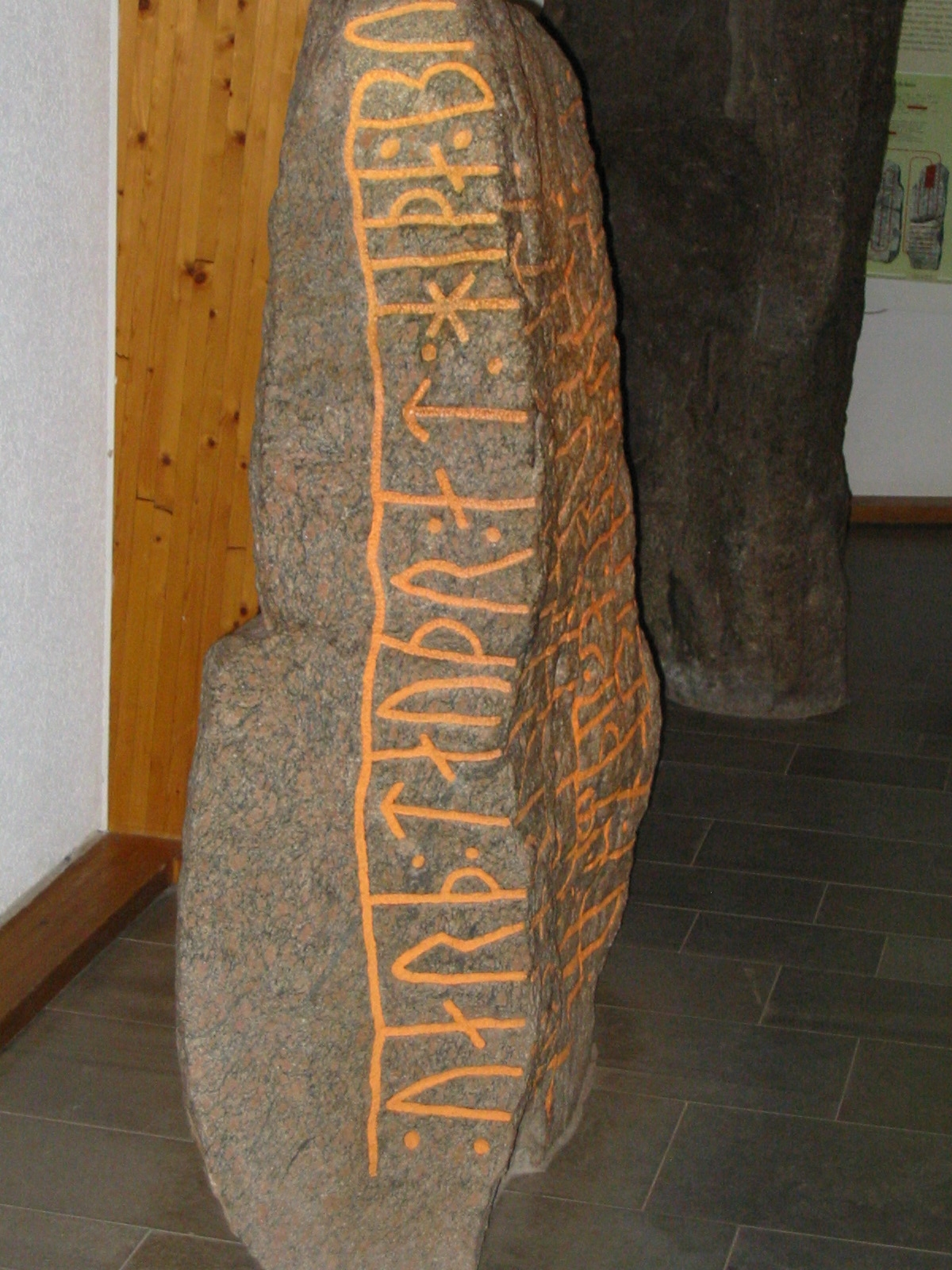
Side view of the Skarthi Stone.

The Skarthi Stone (Danish: Skardesten), also known as Hedeby 3 or DR 3 for its Rundata catalog number, was found in 1857 at Danevirke. It was raised in about 982. This granite runestone is currently displayed at the Hedeby Viking Museum.

The reference in the inscription to King Sveinn is believed to refer to Sweyn Forkbeard (Old Norse Sveinn Tjúguskegg), and "the west" to a campaign in England. The king commissioned the stone in honor of Skarði, who had the title heimþega or heimþegi (pl. heimþegar), meaning "home-receiver" (i.e., one who is given a house by another). A total of six runestones in Denmark refer to a person with this title, the others being DR 1, DR 154, DR 155, DR 296, and DR 297. The use of the term in the inscriptions suggest a strong similarity between heimþegar and the Old Norse term húskarl (literally, "house man"), or housecarl. Like housecarls, heimþegar are in the service of a king or lord, of whom they receive gifts (here, homes) for their service. Some, like Johannes Brøndsted, have interpreted heimþegi as being nothing more than a local Danish variant of húskarl.

=== Runic inscription ===
: suin : kunukʀ : sati : ¶ stin : uftiʀ : skarþa ¶ sin : himþiga : ias : uas : ¶ : farin : uestr : ion : nu :
{} Sveinn {} konungr {} setti {} {} stein {} eptir {} Skarða, {} sinn {} heimþega, {} er {} var {} {} {} farinn {} vestr, {} en {} nú {}
King Sveinn placed the stone in memory of Skarði, his retainer, who travelled to the west, but who then

: uarþ : tauþr : at : hiþa:bu
{} varð {} dauðr {} at {} Heiðabý.
died at Hedeby.

=== Translations ===
King Sveinn raised this stone in memory of his housecarl, Skardi, who had roamed the west but now has met death at Hedeby.

— Johannes Brøndsted, 1960

King Sven erected this stone in memory of Skarthi, his loyal follower, who had been in the West but then met his death near Haithabu.

— Martina Sprague, 2007

King Sveinn placed the stone in memory of Skarði, his retainer, who travelled [sic] to the west, but who then died at Hedeby.

— Scandinavian Runic-text Database, 2020
