= Egtved Runestone =

Coordinates: 55°37′11.64″N 9°18′1.43″E

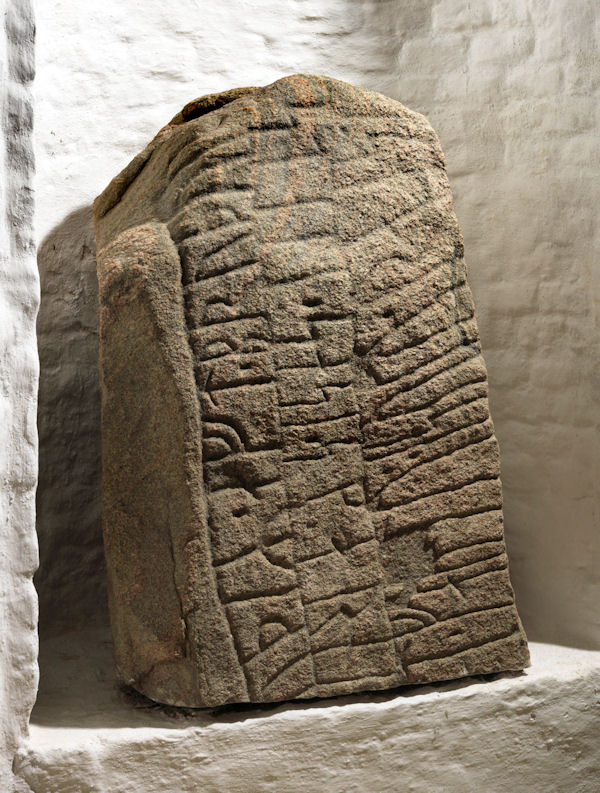
DR 37

The Egtved Runestone or DR 37 is a Viking Age runestone engraved in Old Norse with the Younger Futhark runic alphabet. It was discovered in 1863, by a master mason named Anders Nielsen from Starup, in the southern part of the cemetery of Egtved church. It is dated to the period 900–1020. The stone is in granite and measures 80 cm in height, 55 cm in width and 43 cm in thickness. The style of the runestone is the runestone style RAK.

In an article Lis Jacobsen discussed possible interpretations that were not included in the standard work Danmarks Runeindskrifter 1941-42. She said that the phrase "brōðiʀ æft brōður" and "stæinn sāsi" connect the inscription to a group of warrior band inscriptions, i.e. the Hällestad Runestones and the Sjörup Runestone, which are connected to the Jomsvikings and the legendary Battle of the Fýrisvellir in Uppland, Sweden. However, the inscription is challenging to read and Jacobsen's interpretation is rather uncertain. Jacobsen suggests that the runes suiu refer to the location Svia in Vaksala parish, Uppland, Sweden; an interpretation that is contested. However, the Scandinavian Runic-text Database accepts Jacobsen's analysis and does not add a question mark to it, as can be seen below.

== Inscription ==
... ... ...at ' fai(n) ['] (t)u ÷ i suiu ' raist ¶ ... ...uþiʀ ' aft ' bruþur ¶ stain ' sasi ' skarni ' ...
... ... ... {} Fain, {} do {} i Swiu. {} Rest {} ... [br]oþiʀ {} æft {} broþur. {} Sten {} sasi {} ... {} ...
"... ... ... (the) Coloured, (who) died in Svía. Raised ... brother in memory of brother. This stone ... ... "

== See also ==
- List of runestones

== Sources ==
- Enoksen, Lars Magnar (1998). Runor : historia, tydning, tolkning (in Swedish). Lund: Historiska Media. ISBN 978-91-88930-32-3. OCLC 46359334.
- Jacobsen, Lis (1935). "Syv runestenstolkninger". Aarbøger for nordisk oldkyndighed og historie (in Danish). 1935. Copenhagen: Royal Nordic Society of Antiquaries: 167–224. ISSN 0084-585X.
- Peterson, Lena (2007). Nordiskt runnamnslexikon. Uppsala: Institutet för språk och folkminnen.
