= Housecarl =

Medieval Northern European social rank

A housecarl (Old Norse: húskarl; Old English: huscarl) was a non-servile manservant or household bodyguard in medieval Northern Europe.

The institution originated amongst the Norsemen of Scandinavia, and was brought to Anglo-Saxon England by the Danish conquest in the 11th century. They were well-trained, and paid as full-time soldiers. In England, the royal housecarls had a number of roles, both military and administrative, and they fought under Harold Godwinson at the Battle of Hastings.

== Etymology ==
Housecarl is a calque of the original Old Norse term, húskarl, which literally means "house man". Karl is cognate to the Old English churl, or ceorl, meaning a man, or a non-servile peasant. The Anglo-Saxon Chronicle uses hiredmenn as a term for all paid warriors and thus is applied to housecarl, but it also refers to butsecarls (Note: Butsecarl is a term that has been translated to mean 'sailor' and 'warrior' but is very likely a combination of the two.) and lithsmen. It is not clear whether these were types of housecarl or different altogether.

== In Scandinavia ==
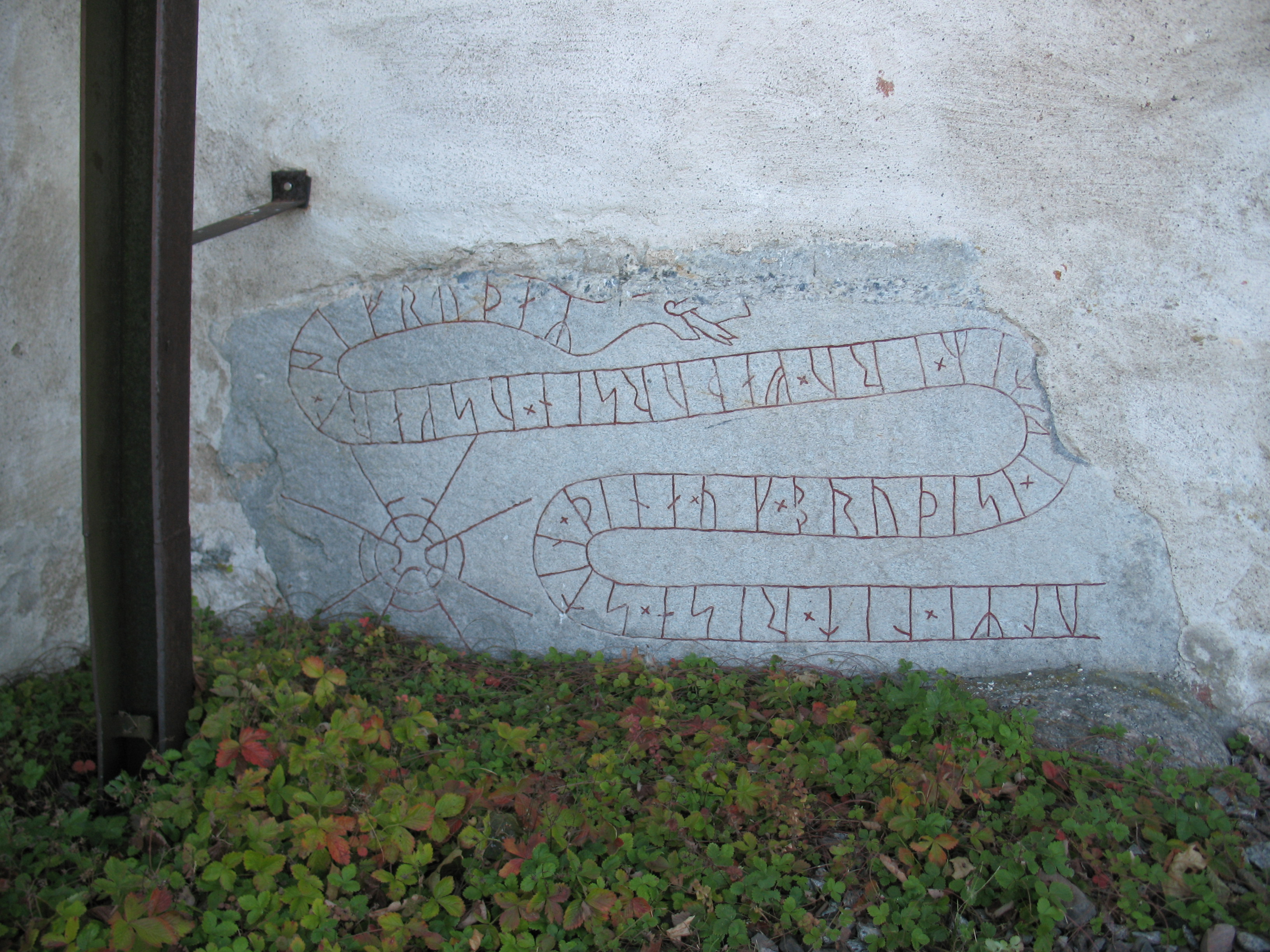
The runestone U 335 at Orkesta commemorates the housecarl of a local lord.

=== As free manservants ===
Originally, the Old Norse word húskarl (plural: húskarlar) (spelled huskarl, pl. huskarlar in Swedish) had a general sense of "manservant", as opposed to the húsbóndi, the "master of the house". In that sense, the word had several synonyms: griðmenn ("home-men") in Norway and Iceland, innæsmæn ("inside-men") in Denmark. Housecarls were free men, not to be confused with thralls (slaves or serfs); to this effect, the Icelandic laws also call them einhleypingar ("lone-runners") and lausamenn ("men not tied"). Both terms emphasise that they were voluntarily in service of another, as opposed to thralls.

=== As combatant retainers ===
With time, the term "housecarls" (húskarlar) came to acquire a specific sense of "retainers", in the service of a lord, in his hirð, lid or drótt (all meaning "bodyguard", "troop of retainers"). In Denmark, this was also the sense of the word himthige, a variant of húskarl (see below). This meaning can be seen, for instance, on the Turinge stone:

Ketill and Bjôrn, they raised this stone in memory of Þorsteinn, their father; Ônundr in memory of his brother and the housecarls in memory of the just(?) (and) Ketiley in memory of her husbandman. These brothers were the best of men in the land and abroad in the retinue [lid], held their housecarls well. He fell in battle in the east in Garðar (Russia), commander of the retinue [lid], the best of landholders.

According to Omeljan Pritsak, this Þorsteinn may have commanded the retinue of Yaroslav the Wise, the Grand Prince of Kiev. Thus, the housecarls mentioned here would be royal bodyguards; in any case, it can be seen here that the word "housecarl" now applied to a person who fought in the service of a different person.

=== In Norwegian service: the heiðþegar ===
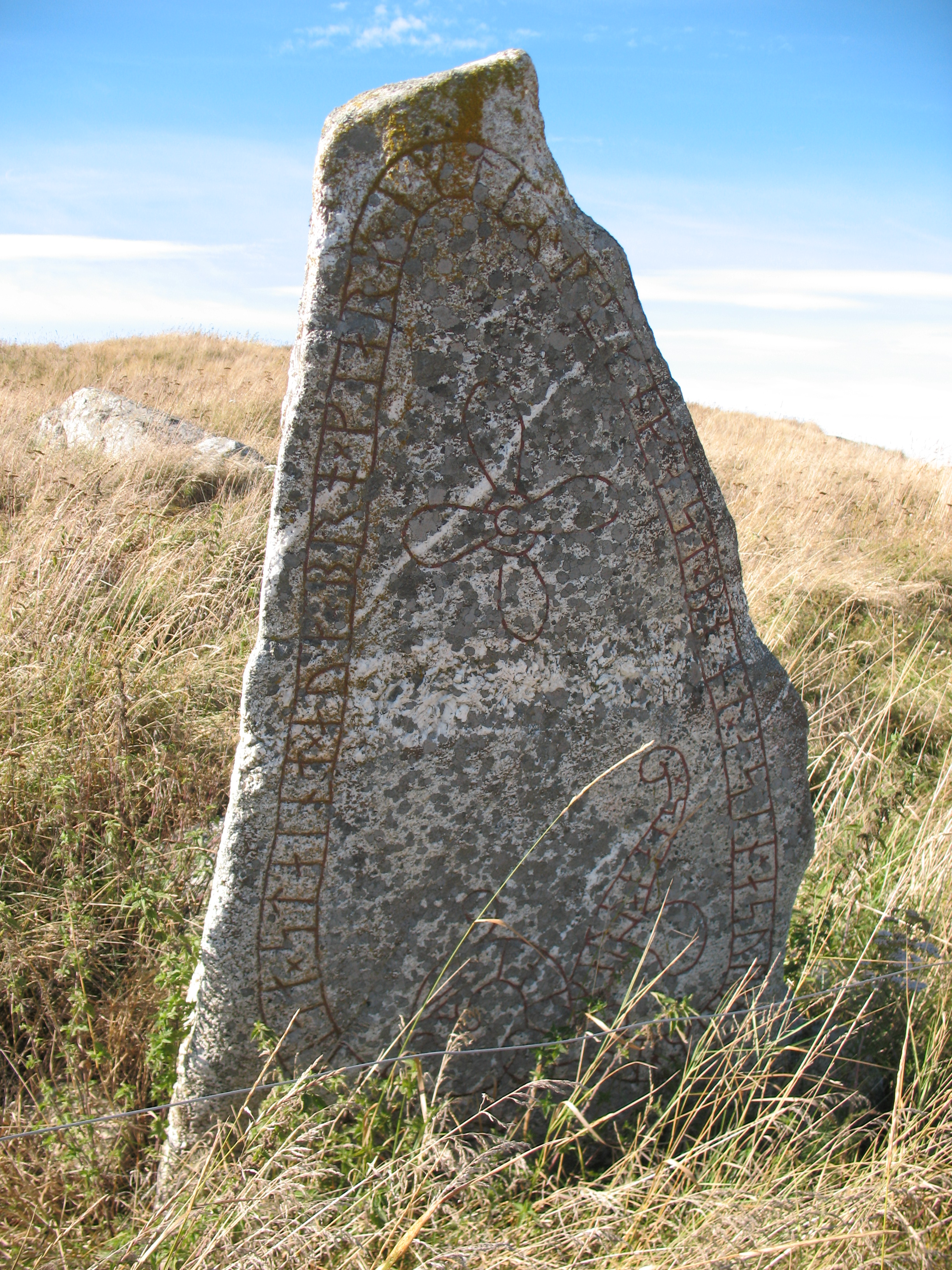
Runestone U 330, one of the Snottsta and Vreta Runestones in Uppland, Sweden, mentions Assurr/Ôzurr, the housecarl of the owner of the Snottsta estate in whose memory the stone was raised.

In Norway, housecarls were members of the king's or another powerful man's hirð. The institution of the hirð in Norway can be traced back to the ninth century. The texts dealing with royal power in medieval Norway, the Heimskringla and the Konungs skuggsjá ("King's Mirror"), make explicit the link between a king or leader and his retainers (housecarls and hirðmenn). There was a special fine for the killing of a king's man, which in Konungs skuggsjá is underlined as an advantage of entering the king's service. Conversely, retainers were expected to avenge their leader if he was killed.

Sigvatr Þórðarson (also known as Sigvat the Skald), a court poet to two kings of Norway, Olaf II of Norway (saint Olaf) and Magnus the Good (and also to two kings of Denmark), called the retainers of Olaf II of Norway heiðþegar, meaning "gift- (or pay-)receivers". More precisely, Snorri Sturluson explained that "heið-money is the name of the wages or gift which chieftains give". Thus, Sigvat probably referred to an institution similar to the Danish heimþegar (see below) or to the housecarls of Cnut the Great (see below): free men in the service of a king or lord, who gave them gifts as payment of said service. It is known from Icelandic sources that in the 1060s, the royal housecarls were paid with Norwegian coins.

=== The housecarls of the Danish kings: the heimþegar ===
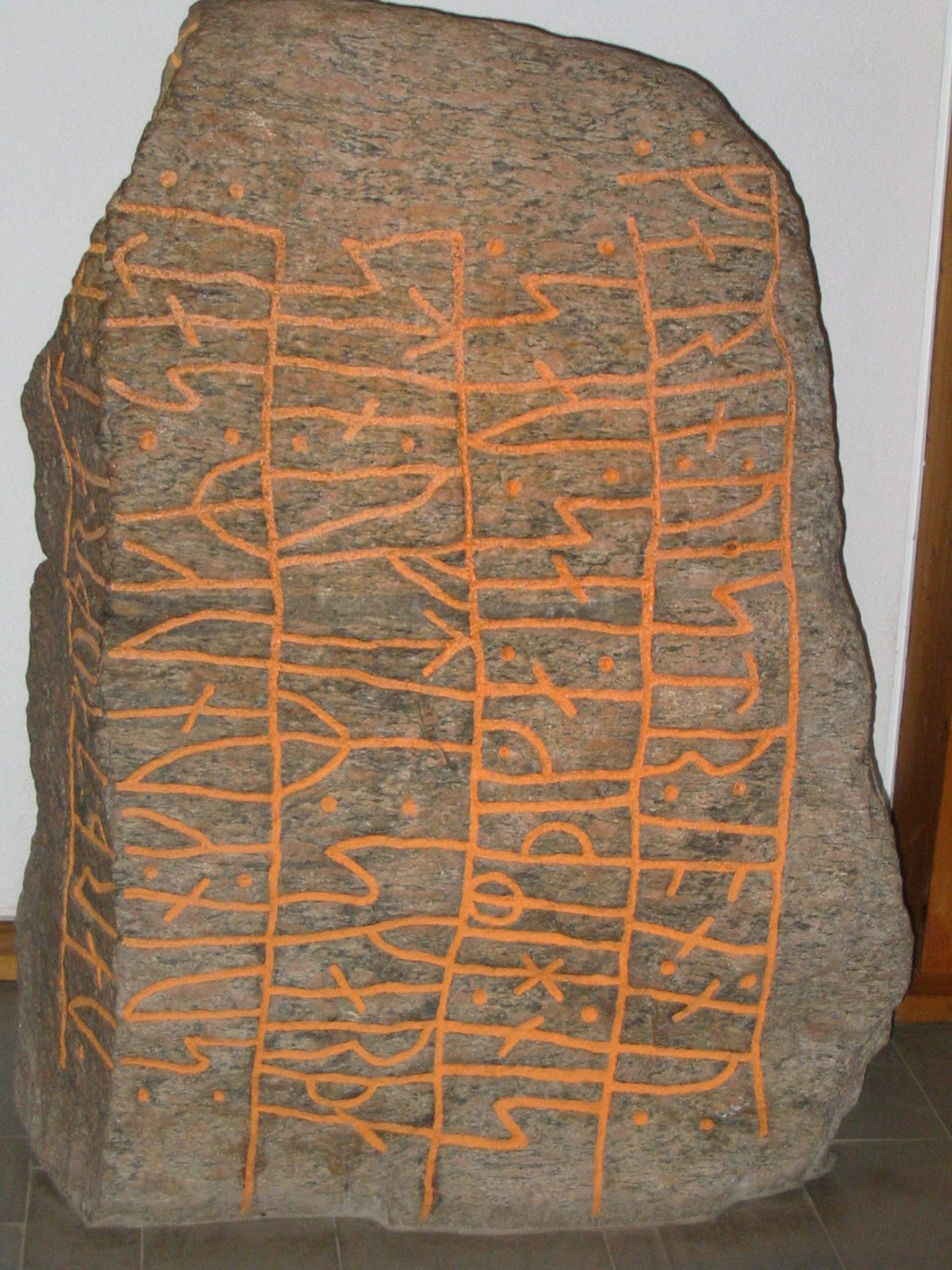
The Skarthi Stone (DR 3), placed by king Sveinn "in memory of his housecarl [heimþega], Skardi"

Six runestones in Denmark, DR 1, DR 3, DR 154, DR 155, DR 296, and DR 297, use the term heimþegi (pl. heimþegar), meaning "home-receiver" (i.e. one who is given a house by another). The use of the term in the inscriptions suggest a strong similarity between heimþegar and housecarls: like housecarls, heimþegar are in the service of a king or lord, of whom they receive gifts (here, homes) for their service. Johannes Brøndsted interpreted heimþegi as nothing more than a local (Danish) variant of húskarl.

Johannes Brøndsted suggested that the garrison of the Danish fort of Trelleborg may have consisted of royal housecarls, and that kings Svein Forkbeard and Cnut the Great may have "safeguarded the country by a network of forts manned by the royal housecarls, the mercenaries, the hird". Among the Hedeby stones, the Stone of Eric (DR 1) is dedicated by a royal retainer to one of his companions:

Thurlf, Sven's retainer [heimþegi, a variant of húskarl according to Brøndsted] erected this stone after Erik his fellow, who died when the warriors sat around [i.e. besieged] Hedeby, but he was a commander, a very brave warrior.

"Sven" is probably king Svein Forkbeard, as elsewhere on the Hedeby stones. Another runestone there, the Skarthi Stone (DR 3), was apparently personally raised by king Svein:

King Sveinn raised this stone in memory of his housecarl [heimþega], Skardi, who had roamed the west [a possible reference to a campaign in England] but now has met death at Hedeby.

Under Svein Forkbeard and Cnut the Great, when the Danish kings came to rule England, a body of royal housecarls was developed there, with institutions that were partly of Norse inspiration, and partly inspired by canon law (see below). But even after the Danish kings had lost England, housecarls continued to exist in Denmark. Such a group of royal retainers was still in place at the beginning of the 12th century, under Niels of Denmark, when, according to Danish historian Svend Aggesen, Aggesen's grandfather, a member of the retinue, was tried for the murder of a fellow housecarl. Svend Aggesen's account of the law governing Cnut the Great's housecarls in 11th century England (the Witherlogh or Lex Castrensis) may reflect, in fact, those governing Danish housecarls in the 12th century. But, by the end of the 12th century, housecarls had probably disappeared in Denmark; they had transformed into a new kind of nobility, whose members no longer resided at the king's court.

== In England ==
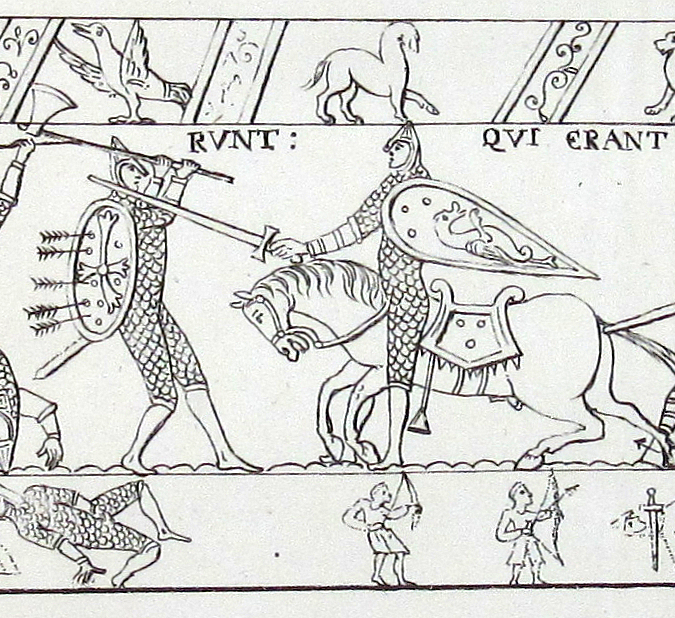
The Bayeux Tapestry depicts an English housecarl (left), wielding a Dane axe with two hands.

The term entered the English language when Svein Forkbeard and Cnut the Great conquered and occupied Anglo-Saxon England; the housecarls of Cnut were highly disciplined bodyguards. It is unclear, however, whether Cnut's housecarls were all Scandinavians; some were Slavs according to Domesday Book records and according to Susan Reynolds, it is likely that some of them were English, with many Englishmen becoming housecarls early in Cnut's reign.

Housecarls were only one group of paid soldiers or hiredmenn who fought for England before the Norman Conquest. From the annals, it is not clear whether other paid men were types of housecarl or a different subdivision of retainers. There were groups known as lithsmen (Note: The name lithsmen or lið is an ambiguous term which is thought to mean 'sailor' in Anglo-Saxon, but seems to mean 'warrior' in the Norse literature. However they were undoubtedly some form of standing force; possibly the Nordic sources referred to the Anglo-Saxon seamen they faced in this manner.) and butsecarls, who were soldiers that were equally adept in land and maritime warfare. Also, there were bands of foreign warriors under the control of foreign commanders, who sometimes served as the retinues of important Anglo-Saxon lords. For example, one version of the Anglo-Saxon Chronicle refers to Earl Tostig's retainers as hiredmenn whereas another version calls them hus karlas. As Tostig was fighting against the king at the time, then the use of the term housecarl seems to have been a synonym for a mercenary or retainer rather than just royal bodyguards. It also would have been used to differentiate between that of the paid warrior and the unpaid militia known as the fyrd.

=== Organisation as royal bodyguards and courtiers ===
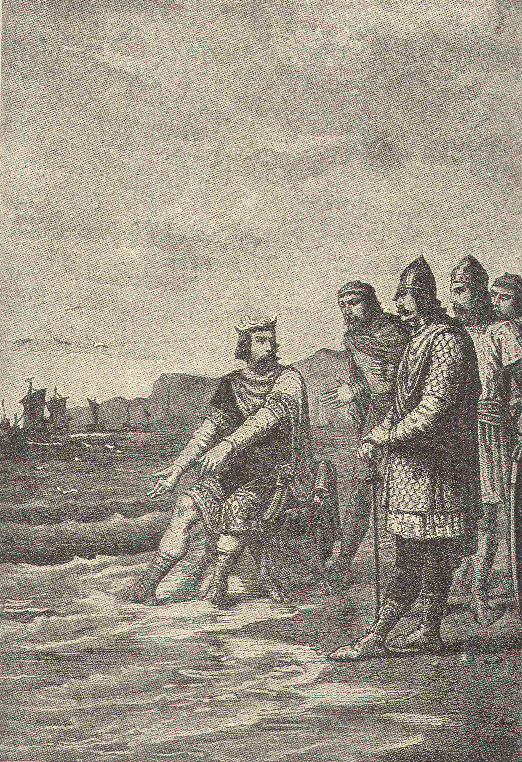
1904 representation of Cnut with his courtiers.

According to 12th century Danish historian Svend Aggesen, Cnut's housecarls were governed by a specific law, the Witherlogh or Lex Castrensis. Their organisation in a band or guild was Scandinavian in character, but the legal process the Witherlogh defines is mainly derived from canon law, directly or through Anglo-Saxon laws. Other possible inspirations include the rules of the Jomsvikings and the rules of the Norwegian hirð. The Whitherlogh defined an etiquette: housecarles were to be seated at the kings' tables according to a number of factors, among which skill in war and nobility. They could be disgraced by being moved to a lower place; this was punishment for minor offences, such as not giving proper care to the horse of a fellow housecarl. After three such offences, the offender could be seated at the lowest place, and no-one was to talk to him, but everyone could throw bones at him at will. The murder of another housecarl was punished by outlawry and exile, whereas treason was punished by death and confiscation of all property. Quarrels between housecarles were decided by a specific tribunal (gemot), the Huskarlesteffne, in the presence of the king; depending on the nature of the quarrel, a varying number of testimonies would be required. However, the Witherlogh as we know it through Svend Aggesen was redacted more than one century after the time of Cnut; thus, we cannot be sure that it presents an accurate picture of Cnut's housecarls.

=== Pay, land grants, and social role ===
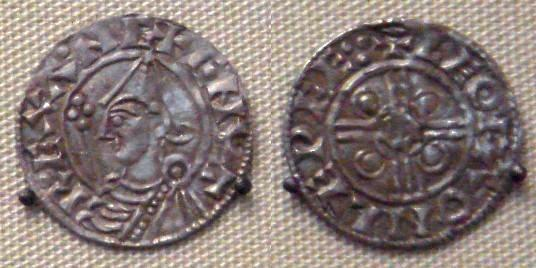
A coin from the reign of Cnut, such as those that may have been used to pay Cnut's housecarls

A special tax was levied to provide pay in coin to the royal housecarls. According to Saxo Grammaticus, the pay was monthly. Due to these wages, the housecarls are seen by some as a type of mercenary; the Knýtlinga saga calls them málamenn ("men receiving wages"), while Florence of Worcester uses the term solidarii ("salarymen") and William of Malmesbury that of stipendarii ("paid men"). Furthermore, the housecarles were not bound to indefinite service; but there was only one day in the year during which they could leave the king's service. That was New Year's Eve, a day on which it was customary for Scandinavian kings to reward their retainers with gifts.

On one hand, the number of housecarls receiving land grants and estates from the king seems to have been rather limited, from the beginning of Cnut's reign up to the Norman conquest in 1066. At that last date, the Domesday Book records only thirty-three landholding housecarls in the kingdom; furthermore, these estates were small. Thus, it does not seem that the English landholders were deprived of their properties to provide for land grants to the king's housecarls. On the other hand, some of Cnut's housecarls seem to have been quite prosperous; the Abbotsbury Abbey was founded either by one of them under the reign of Cnut himself, or by his wife under the reign of Edward the Confessor.

=== Administrative role ===
The royal housecarls had some administrative duties in peacetime as the King's representatives. Florence of Worcester recounts how, in 1041, there was a revolt against a very heavy levy in Worcester, and two of king Harthacnut's housecarls, who were acting as tax collectors, were killed.

=== Military role ===
Because the main sources on Cnut's housecarls were written at least one century after Cnut's reign, there are several theories about the exact nature and role of these housecarls. Cnut is said to have retained 3,000 to 4,000 men with him in England, to serve as his bodyguard. One theory is that these men were Cnut's housecarls, and that they served as a well-equipped, disciplined, professional, and quite numerous (for the time) standing army at the service of the king. However, another theory is that there was nothing like an important, standing, royal army in 11th century Anglo-Saxon England.

This debate has direct consequences on the assessment of the housecarls' specificities, and whether or not they were an elite troop. For instance, Charles Oman, in his book The Art of War in the Middle Ages (1885), states that the main advantage of the housecarls at Hastings were their esprit de corps. This view, still widely held today, mainly stems from Svend Aggesen's 12th-century description of Cnut's housecarls as a group characterized by a strict code (see above); Aggesen having been used as a main source by L.M. Larson's The King's Household in England Before the Norman Conquest (1902). However, more recently, historian Nicholas Hooper criticised Larson and stated that "it is time to debunk the housecarl"; according to Hooper, housecarls were not in effect distinguishable from Saxon thegns, and were mainly retainers who received lands or pay (or both), but without being really a standing army. Hooper asserts that while the Housecarles might well have had superior esprit de corps and more uniform training and equipment than the average Thegn, they would not necessarily have been a clearly defined military elite.

Yet another theory is that the role of a standing army was not assumed, or was not mostly assumed, by the royal housecarls; but that the housecarls were a smaller body of household troops, partly stationed at the king's court. During the reign of Edward the Confessor, a number of sailors and soldiers, the lithsmen, were paid wages and possibly based in London; those lithsmen were, according to some, the main standing armed force, while the housecarls were only acting as a secondary one.

One reason to doubt the existence of a standing army made of housecarls is that, when there was a revolt in 1051, under the reign of Edward the Confessor, no such standing army was used to crush it, whereas its existence would have allowed for a swift, decisive action against the rebels.

=== The housecarls of Harold Godwinson: Stamford Bridge and Hastings ===
By the end of the 11th century in England, there may have been as many as 3,000 Englishmen who were royal housecarls. As the household troops of Harold Godwinson, the housecarls had a crucial role as the backbone of Harold's army at Hastings. Although they were numerically the smaller part of Harold's army, their possibly superior equipment and training meant they could have been used to strengthen the militia, or fyrd, which made up most of Harold's troops. The housecarls were positioned in the centre, around their leader's standard, but also probably in the first ranks of both flanks, with the fyrdmen behind them. In the Battle of Hastings, these Housecarls fought after Harold's death, holding their oath to him until the last man was killed.

The Bayeux Tapestry depicts the housecarls as footmen clad in mail, with conical nasal helmets, and fighting with great, two-handed long axes.

== See also ==
- Comitatus
- Druzhina
- Hird
- Leidang
- Yeomen of the Guard
- Thingmen
