= Valtoke Gormsson =

Danish Warlord, Son of Gorm the Old

- Born: c. 947–950
- Died: 986; Battle of Fýrisvellir, Uppsala
- Issue: Asbjørn Tókason
- House: House of Gorm
- Father: Gorm the Old
- Mother: Unknown

Valtoke Gormsson (also known as Toke) was a Danish warlord or petty king, known from several runestones. Valtoke is mentioned on two runestones that note a battle at Uppsala, interpreted as the Battle of Fýrisvellir, as well as two more that mention people part of Tokis hird. These stones also mention that he was the son of Gorm, which could be the Danish king Gorm the Old, and an Asbjørn who had a father named Toki. There is also a runestone at Aars, which once marked the cairn of "Valtóki".

== Attestations ==
- The Hällestad Runestones:
  - DR 295 is raised by Áskell, a retainer of Toki in his memory, and describes how Áskell did not flee at Uppsala.
  - DR 296 is raised in memory of Erra, a retainer of Toki.
  - DR 297 is raised by "Ásbjôrn, Tóki's retainer", in memory of "Tóki, his brother".
- The Sjörup Runestone was raised by Saxi, in memory of Ásbjôrn, son of Toki or Tofi (the rune is damaged), and also mentions the battle at Uppsala.
- The Aars stone is raised in memory of Valtoki, and says that it marks his cairn.
