= Aars stone =

Viking Age runestone

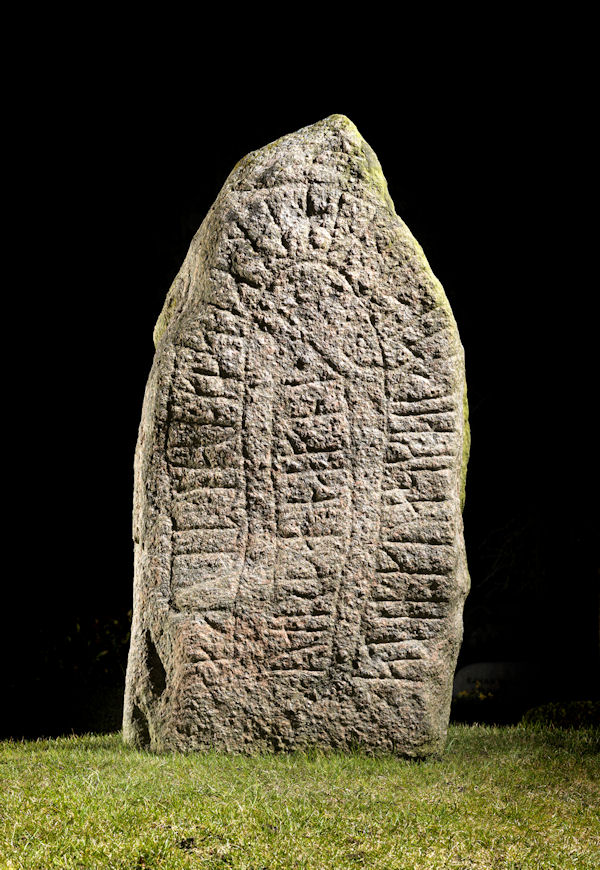
Aars stone, back

The Aars stone (Danish: Års-stenen) or DR 131 is a late Viking Age runestone located on a mound in the churchyard at Aars in Himmerland, Denmark. Dated to the late 10th to early 11th century, it bears an inscription in the Younger Fuþark in memory of Toke Gormsson, known as Valtoke, who died at the Battle of Fýrisvellir.

== Description ==
The stone is 160 centimetres (5 ft 3 in) high and 77 centimetres (2 ft 6 in) wide. It is inscribed on both sides, and decorated with semicircles inside the text band and a "U" shape above the text on the front. It is dated to between 970 and 1020.First described by J. Meier in 1654, it was lying face-down in the churchyard; in 1838 Peder Goth Thorsen examined it and discovered the inscription on the front. In the 1920s it was re-erected on a mound west of the south transept. It is believed to have originally stood north-east of the church, probably as part of a memorial assemblage comparable to the Jelling stones.

The inscription, in Younger Fuþark runes 14–19.4 centimetres (5.5–7.6 in) high, is read in boustrophedon, initially from left to right on the front and continuing from the front lower right to the back lower left and from the back lower right to the middle text band, which is read from bottom to top and ends in a point. The inscription on the back includes alliteration that may be formulaic.

== Inscription ==
First line is transliteration; second is transcription in Old Norse.

ąsur : sati : stin : þąnsi : aft : ual:tuka : trutin {: | :} sin
Assurr {} satti {} stēn {} þannsi {} æft {} Val-Tōka, {} drōttin {} sinn.
Ǫzurr placed this stone in memory of Valtóki, his lord.

stin : kuask : hirsi : stąnta : ląki : saR : ual:tuka {: | :} uarþa : nafni
Stēnn {} kvæðsk {} hērsi {} standa {} længi, {} sāR {} Val-Tōka {} varða {} næfni.
The stone proclaims that it will long stand here; it will name Valtóki's cairn.

Valtoke, or Wal-Tóki, was Toke Gormsson, a son of the Danish king Gorm the Old. He died fighting against the Swedish king Eric the Victorious in the Battle of Fýrisvellir near Uppsala; Danish Runic Inscription 295, one of the Hällestad Runestones, also commemorates his death.
