= Anna Elsa Hornum =

Danish amateur archeologist (1877–1971)

Anna Elsa Hornum, also known as Annaelse Hornum (born 1877 in Ribe, died 1971 in Rudkøbing) was a Danish amateur archaeologist, who was the housekeeper and the closest employee to the Langeland archaeologist Jens Jørgen Winther, who founded the Langelands Museum in Rudkøbing. She was the second woman admitted to the Royal Nordic Society of Antiquaries.

== Biography ==
Hornum became housekeeper for Jens Winther in 1912 in Østergade in Langeland and immediately became interested in his passion for archaeology. She was Winther's closest employee until his death in 1955. In addition to managing the household, she was an active participant in Winther's archaeological excavations at, for example, the well-known Stone Age sites Troldebjerg and Blandebjerg and Lindø. Hornum was perceived as a skilled field archaeologist, although her contributions are not found in writing. She took care of all the practical aspects of the excavations including catering meals for workers at the archeological site.

Anna Elsa Hornum made her debut as an excavating amateur archaeologist in 1915 on Lindø, which is today a well-known Stone Age settlement from the Neolithic Age. At the Lindø excavations, Hornum was taught by Holger Friis. A few years later, Winther and Hornum began the excavation of another known site from the Stone Age - Troldebjerg. Her skill as an archaeologist at Troldebjerg earned her an invitation to an excavation in Greenland, "where she took part in investigations of Eskimo sites."

In the summer of 1934, she participated in excavations of Inuit settlements together with the museum inspector and archeologist Therkel Mathiassen. The excavations and the journey to Greenland were a unique event in Hornum's life. Unfortunately, she did not write a travel diary, but both Mathiassen and Aage Kristensen did and they mention her. Many of the expedition's participants also took pictures that captured Hornum's roles as both excavator and cook. In the summer of 1934, Jens Winther did not carry out his usual excavations at Langeland. When Hornum returned to the island of Langeland, she traveled around and gave lectures about the expedition.

Hornum was a central figure in an work of important archaeologists who, as young students, visited Winther's excavations in the 1920s and 1930s and received practical training as field archaeologists. Among the visitors were Peter Glob, CJ Becker, Ole Klindt-Jensen, J. Troels-Smith, Holger Rasmussen, Hans Norling-Christensen, Thorkild Ramskou, Peter Rismøller and Kristjan Eldjarn. Officially, it was Hornum's responsibility to provide for food for the young people, but she participated to the same extent in the excavations. Hornum was an important figure who secured the items discovered during excavations, while Winther concentrated on the interpretations.

== Later life and recognition ==
In 1951, with the recommendation of professor Johannes Brøndsted, Hornum was admitted to the Royal Nordic Society of Antiquaries, making her the second woman invited to become a member.

Winther died in 1955, and the terms of his will ensured that Hornum could stay in the apartment they shared in Østergade. Langelands Museum's board took care of the apartment's lease, but there was more than one disagreement between the board and Hornum. In April 1971, after a short illness, she died at Rudkøbing Hospital.
