= Hällestad Runestones =

Runestones in Sweden

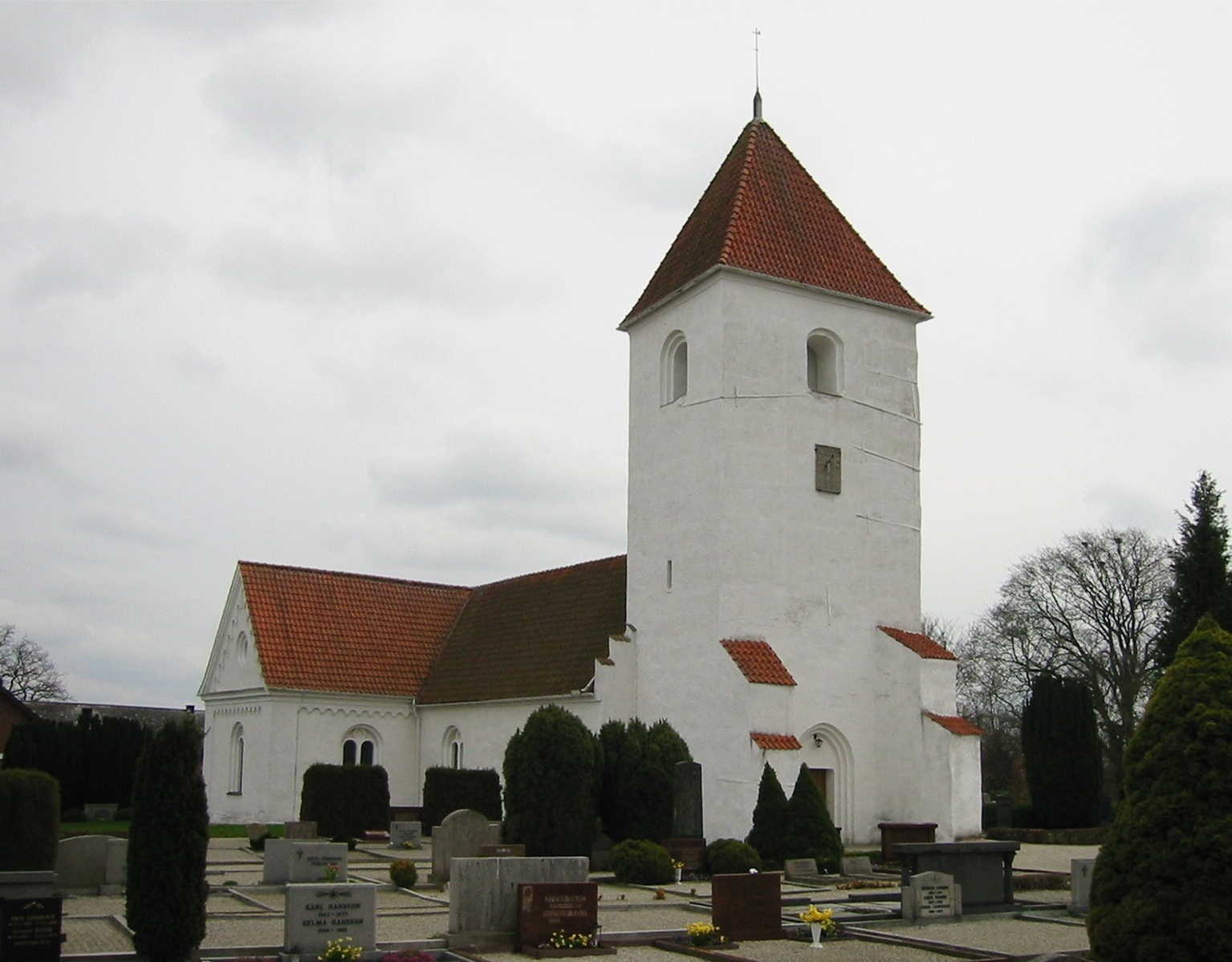
Hällestad Church where the runestones are located

The Hällestad Runestones are three runestones located in the walls of Hällestad Church in Torna-Hällestad, about 20 kilometers east of Lund in Skåne, southern Sweden. Their Rundata identifiers are DR 295, 296, and 297. DR 295 is notable because it is held to be raised in memory of a warrior who fell in the legendary Battle of the Fýrisvellir, near Uppsala, Sweden between the Jomsvikings led by Styrbjörn the Strong and Styrbjörn's uncle Eric the Victorious, the king of Sweden, c. 985. The other stones were raised by the same people, and they probably formed a monument together in memory of comrades lost in the battle. The Karlevi Runestone, the Egtved Runestone and the Sjörup Runestone may be connected to them.

== DR 295 ==
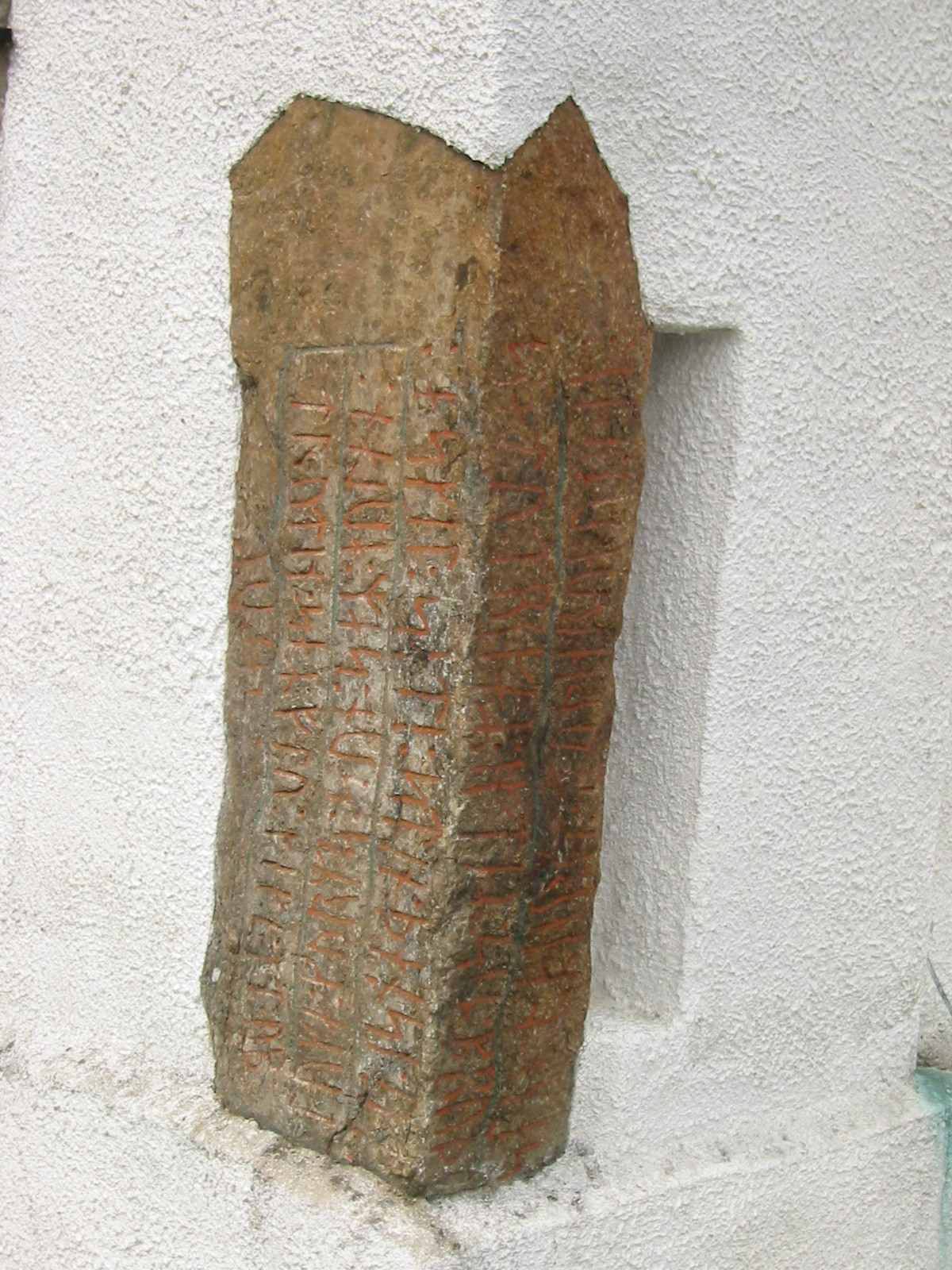
DR 295.

This sandstone runestone, which is walled into the south-western corner of the church of Hällestad, has been known since the late 17th century. The inscription begins in the left row on the front side and follows the boustrophedon order of reading. The inscription is dated to the late 10th century, and shows an early dotted k-rune which represents the g-phoneme in aigi It also contains an unusual dotted m-rune, which is however only for decorative purposes since it does not change the pronunciation (compare the Transjö Runestone). An interesting detail is the fact that it calls Toki Gormsson "brother", which should be interpreted as "brother-in-arms" and not a biological brother. The Viking Age warbands consisted of brotherhoods, where each member had equal worth, including the warchief who in this case was Toki Gormsson. Toki was probably the son of the Danish king Gorm the Old, who died c. 958 or 959. This Toki is not remembered by the Norse sagas but, unlike the sagas, the runestones constitute contemporary documentation. Also notable is that the stone reports that the men went closest to Toki, meaning that the best warriors formed a shield circle around the warchief during battle in order to show fealty to their leader (compare with the Kålsta Runestone). The hill which is referred to was probably a barrow in which the brothers-in-arms buried Toki according to the traditions of the time.

=== Inscription ===
First line is transliteration; second is transcription in Old Norse.

: askil : sati : stin : þansi : ift[iʀ] ¶ : tuka : kurms : sun : saʀ : hulan : ¶ trutin : saʀ : flu : aigi : at : ub:¶:salum
{} Æskel {} satti {} sten {} þænsi {} æftiʀ {} {} Toka {} Gorms {} sun, {} seʀ {} hullan {} {} drottin. {} Saʀ {} flo {} ægi {} at {} Upsalum
Áskell placed this stone in memory of Tóki Gormr's son, to him a faithful lord. He did not flee at Uppsala.

satu : trikaʀ : iftiʀ : sin : bruþr ¶ stin : o : biarki : stuþan : runum : þiʀ :
sattu {} drængiaʀ {} æftiʀ {} sin {} broþur {} sten {} a {} biargi {} støþan {} runum. {} Þeʀ {}
Valiant men placed in memory of their brother the stone on the hill, steadied by runes. They

(k)(u)(r)(m)(s) (:) (t)(u)(k)(a) : kiku : (n)(i)(s)(t)[iʀ]
Gorms {} Toka {} gingu {} næstiʀ.
went closest to Gormr's Tóki.

== DR 296 ==
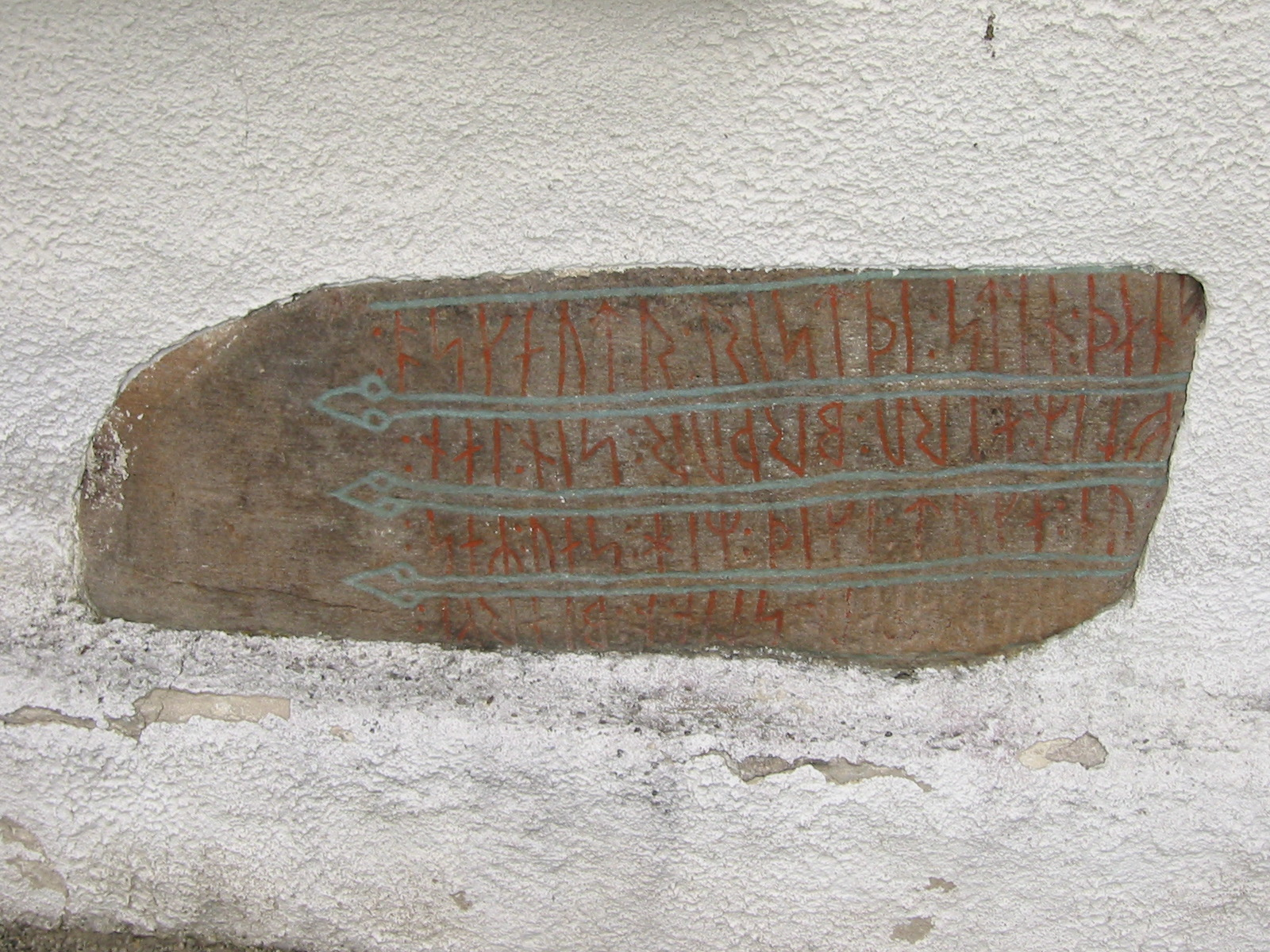
DR 296.

This runestone is contemporary with the preceding runestone and it is made of granite. The inscription refers to Erra as Tóki's hemþægi or heimþegi (pl. heimþegar), meaning "home-receiver" (i.e., one who is given a house by another). A total of six runestones in Denmark refer to a person with this title, the others besides DR 296 and DR 297 being DR 1, DR 3, DR 154, and DR 155. The use of the term in the inscriptions suggest a strong similarity between heimþegar and the Old Norse term húskarl (literally, "house man"), or housecarl. Like housecarls, heimþegar are in the service of a king or lord, of whom they receive gifts (here, homes) for their service. Some, like Johannes Brøndsted, have interpreted heimþegi as being nothing more than a local Danish variant of húskarl.

=== Inscription ===
: oskautr : ristþi : stin : þansi (:) ¶ (:) (i)ftiʀ : airu : brþur : sin : ian : ¶ : saʀ : uas : him:þiki : tuka : nu : ¶ : skal : stato : stin : o : biarki :
{} Asgotr {} resþi {} sten {} þænsi {} {} {} æftiʀ {} Ærru, {} broþur {} sin. {} Æn {} {} {} saʀ {} was {} hemþægi {} Toka. {} Nu {} {} {} skal {} standa {} sten {} a {} biargi. {}
Ásgautr raised this stone in memory of Erra, his brother. And he was Tóki's retainer. Now the stone will stand on the hill.

== DR 297 ==
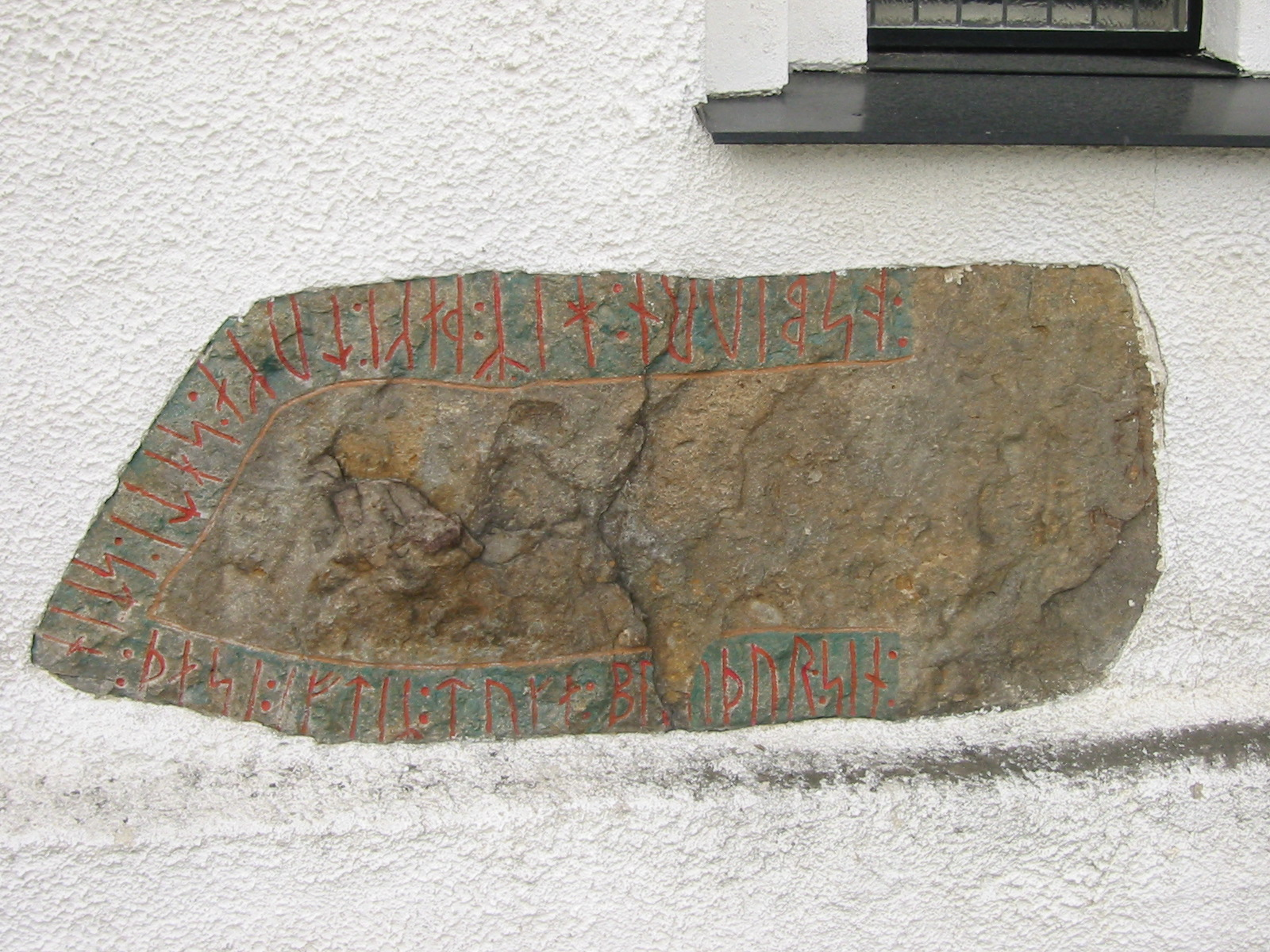
DR 297.

This runestone is contemporary with the preceding runestones and it is made of sandstone. It is probably made by the same runemaster as DR 295. Similar to DR 296, the inscription also refers to Ásbjôrn as being Toki's hemþægi.

=== Inscription ===
: osbiurn : him:þaki : tuka : sati : stin ¶ : þasi : iftiʀ : tuka : bruþur : sin :
{} Æsbiorn, {} hemþægi {} Toka, {} satti {} sten {} {} þæssi {} æftiʀ {} Toka, {} broþur {} sin. {}
Ásbjôrn, Tóki's retainer, placed this stone in memory of Tóki, his brother.
