= Royal Nordic Society of Antiquaries =

The Royal Nordic Society of Antiquaries (Danish: Det Kongelige Nordiske Oldskriftselskab; Icelandic: Hið konunglega norræna fornfræðafélag) was founded in Denmark on 28 January 1825 by among others Carl Christian Rafn and Rasmus Rask. The company's aim is to promote Norse literature, history and archaeology. The society was first royal on 9 May 1828.

The Society admitted the first woman to the society in 1951; Anna Elsa Hornum was the second, recommended by Professor Johannes Brøndsted.

The Society publishes Aarbøger for nordisk Oldkyndighed og Historie

The Society has also published works by Christian Jürgensen Thomsen, Ledetraad Nordic Oldkyndighed (1836), Carl Christian Rafn, Antiquitates Americanae (1837), konung skuggsjá (Kongespeilet) in Danish translation by Finnur Jónsson (1926) and his Lexicon poeticum antiquæ linguæ septentrionalis: Ordbog over det norsk-islandske Skjaldesprog (2nd edition 1931), and the series Nordiske Fortidsminder.
