= Hearthwerod =

Manservants and bodyguards of an Anglo-Saxon lord in his/her household

Hearthwerod (Old English: heorþ-werod) were the household warbands of Anglo-Saxon aristocracy. There were multiple names for them, often hearthwerod, hiredmen, or later huscarl. Anglo-Saxon kings maintained their own warbands since the beginning of the migration to England as a way of enforcing their power, and there is a debate as to what extent and in what way they were assisted on campaign by non-aristocratic infantry. After 1016, the Housecarls were introduced into England as a Scandinavian equivalent to the extant institution.

Reciprocal loyalty was very important to the relationship between a lord and his hearthwerod. He gave them gifts freely and plentifully, and protected them legally and socially, and in exchange they would serve him faithfully. Men were expected to follow their lord into exile if necessary. Those who failed to achieve these standards received societal ridicule and would have difficulty finding employment. The hearthwerod were raised in and around the meadhall, which was a social, political, and ceremonial centre for Anglo-Saxon society.

== Primary sources ==
The most important source for Anglo-Saxon political history was the Anglo-Saxon Chronicle, which is in fact 7 different manuscripts, and not contemporary until the late 9th century. Manuscripts (MSS) A, B, and C are independent from each other, but B and C, which run until the late 10th century, may have both been based on a now lost manuscript. Manuscripts D and E continue into the 12th-century, and closely agree until 1031, at which point they maintain separate narratives. Anglo-Saxon Poetry is important to understanding the traditions and values of the Anglo-Saxons, particularly in terms of lord-retainer relationships. Anglo-Saxon elegies such as The Wanderer are literary sources, and this also applies to battle poems such as Brunanburh and Maldon, which promoted an idea rather than providing a necessarily tactically accurate account of battle. Equally important is Bede's Ecclesiastical History, written in the 7th century. Incidental references in non-narrative sources such as letters, charters, legal codes, and homilies, and references in foreign sources go some way to supplementing the main histories. Physical evidence such as coins, burial sites, and weaponry add to the written word.

== Origins ==
The Anglo-Saxon Settlement of Britain began in earnest during the 5th century after the collapse of Roman rule. Early Anglo-Saxon kingdoms were militarily aggressive, and frequently sought to dominate their neighbours, as well as the native British kingdoms from the 5th to the 7th centuries. A separate warrior elite developed by the time of the migration to Britain, and in the militaristic climate kings would surround themselves with loyal followers who formed his household troops. The institution descended from the Germanic warband, and was related to Frankish traditions.

The Anglo-Saxon term for an aristocratic warband was werod or hearthwerod, which literally referred to a household guard or troop. There was a litany of terms related to a lord's household followers or military retinue, many of which were based around the hearth component, also usually spelt heorth. An aristocratic household was also called a hired, and those who comprised it referred to as hiredmen, or alternatively hiredcnihton, with the cniht component meaning retainer. After 1016, a house-man in England could be called a huscarl.

== Loyalty ==
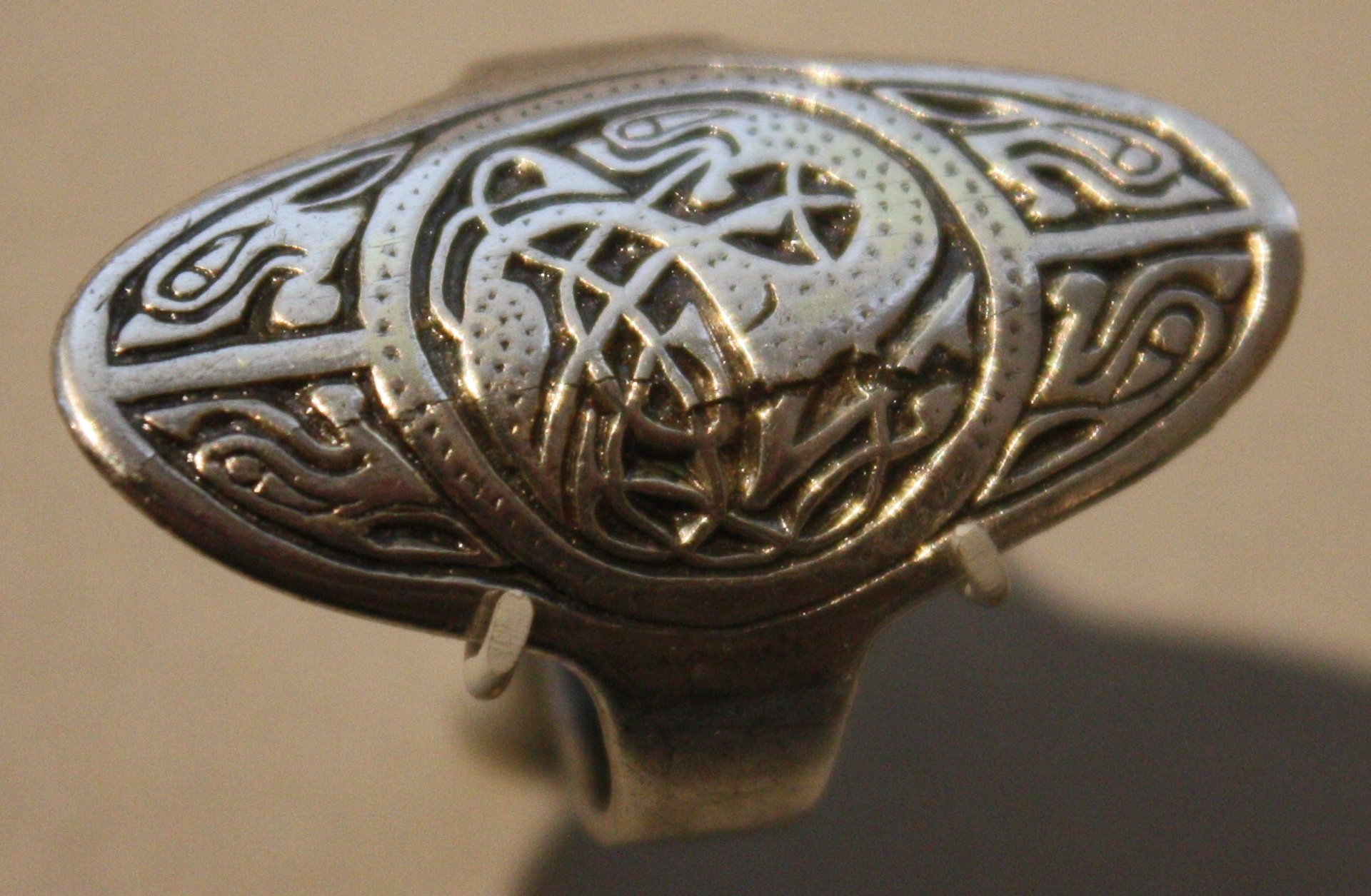
Silver Anglo-Saxon ring (c.775–850). Gift-giving with rings, among other items, by which a lord's followers could be rewarded. Kings and lords were known as "ring-givers".

An aristocratic werod was known to the Anglo-Saxons as a body of men sworn to share their hardship together. After some time, every major political figure would have maintained such a following centred around themselves. Loyalty was important to the arrangement between lord and follower, and superseded that between follower and king. In the late 7th century, Aldhelm of Sherborne wrote a letter demanding that the clerical following of Wilfrid of York follow their lord into exile, a standard that also applied to the nobility.

The Anglo-Saxon Chronicle's entry for 757 details the murder of Cynewulf by Cyneheard Ætheling and Cyneheard's subsequent death at the hands of Cynewulf's men in a bloody battle. Although an annalistic account, the story is likely to have been rather based on literary folklore. To Abels, the chronicler's language is unambiguous in approving the behaviour of Cyneheard's men to fight and die for their lord, even though he found their lord's actions. Rather than dying, Cyneheard would have become king if Cynewulf's men submitted to him, showing that early Anglo-Saxon election was largely done via the submission of the former ruler's household. The account also preserves the idea that if a man didn't die with his lord, he was to avenge him.

The authority of an Anglo-Saxon lord upon which he built his power and established a following was based on his potential to administer reward and punishment. If he fell out of power or favor, the loyalty of his followers could be tested, and he risked abandonment. However a man who abandoned him would themselves become undesirable to any prospective leader, having proved himself either unworthy or unable to carry out his oaths. The historian Barbara Yorke has described the relationship as reciprocal: "the followers fought loyally for their lord, but the loyalty had been purchased beforehand by the upkeep the king provided for his warriors and by the giving of gifts." The will of Æthelstan Ætheling featured as beneficiaries his chaplain, his seneschal, his retainers, and other members of his hired. These gifts took the form of physical items such as weapons, rings, and armor, and, by the late 9th century, liquid wealth.

Once a man had chosen his lord and sworn an oath, he could not abandon him, and doing so carried severe consequences. Betrayal of a lord was one of the "unemendable" crimes in Cnut's Secular Code that could not be resolved by the payment of a fine. The Secular Code (ch. 77–78) details the punishment for cowardice and the recompense for death in combat:

(77) And the man, who in his cowardice deserts his lord or his comrades, whether it is on an expedition by sea or on one on land, is to forfeit all that he owns and his own life; and the lord is to succeed to the possessions and to the land which he previously gave him. (77.1) And if he has bookland, that is to pass into the king’s possession. (78) And the heriot is to be remitted for the man who falls before his lord in a campaign, whether it is within the land or outside the land; and the heirs are to succeed to the land and to the possessions and divide it very justly.

== Social organization ==
The social and political centre of Anglo-Saxon life was the meadhall or heall, where warriors slept, trained, and dined together. It was the home of the lord and his most trusted warriors. Before the advent of Christianity, it was the religious centre where rituals were conducted, and it served as meeting place and stage for ceremony. The great halls at Yeavering and Cowdery's Down near Basingstoke, particularly the former, provide insight to the construction of these buildings. The halls of the feast can be fitted out with items from the Sutton Hoo burial site, such as a vast cauldron, drinking vessels, and silver plates and bowls. Alfred the Great established the burghal system with dozens of fortifications by his death, which alongside the advent of Christian churches and mints subsumed many of the uses of the meadhall, but it remained a vital social and ceremonial institution.

Noble households were split into two tiers, the direct followers of a lord, and the followers of his or her followers. The latter group often lacked the aristocratic pedigree of their peers, and Abels characterises them as young, unmarried common men who hoped to advance themselves through military service. Families who had the means would have their sons placed into the household of a social superior, where they could train in the heall and learn skills for when the boy became a warrior.

== Warfare and use ==
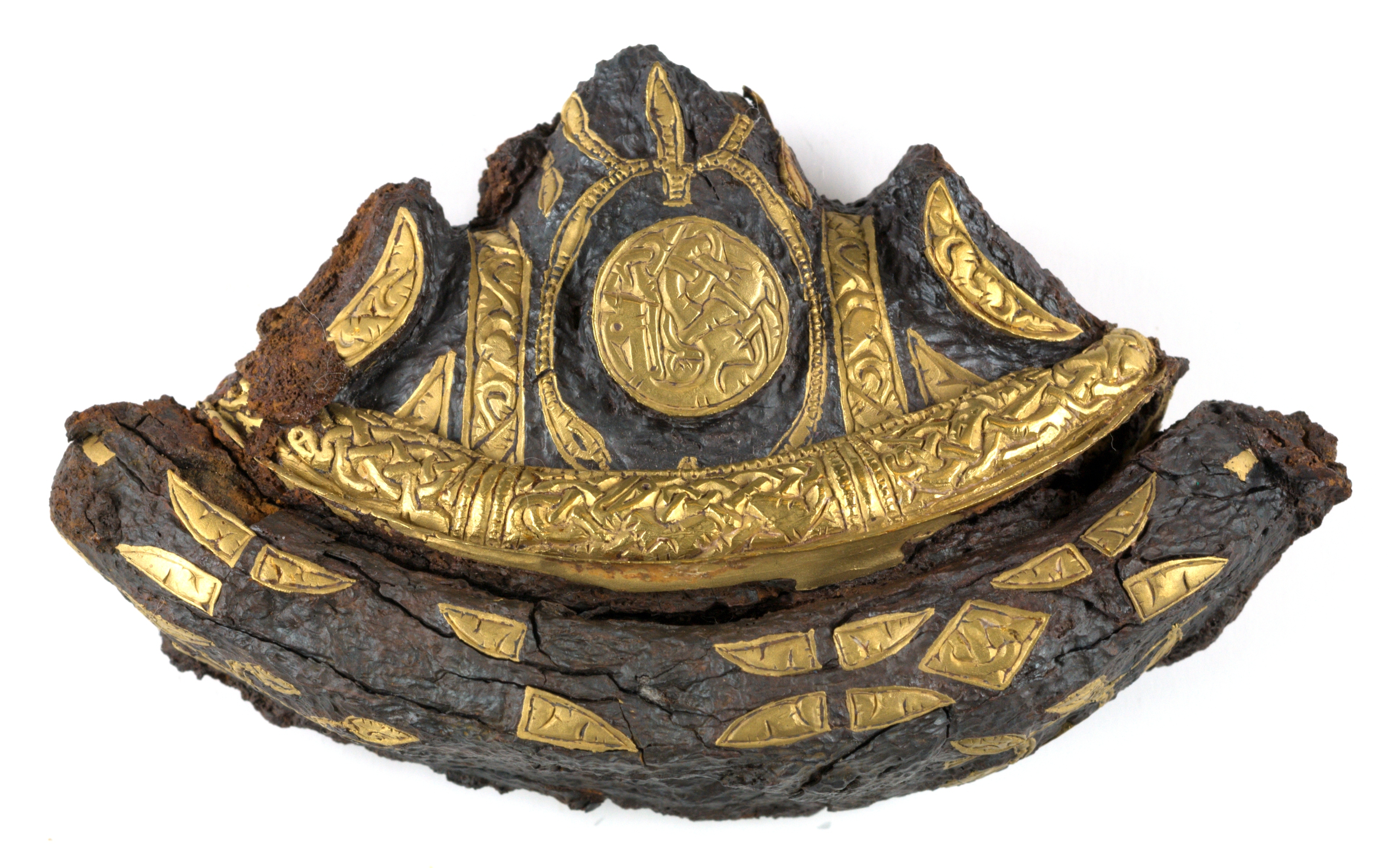
Anglo-Saxon sword pommel from the Bedale Hoard

It has been suggested that early Anglo-Saxon armies were small and were based largely on a lord's personal warband, and some of the evidence for this is in the Laws of Ine, which define an army as more than 35 men. Alternatively, Ine may have been attempting to limit the military forces available to individual ealdormen, meaning that the figure is not an accurate estimate of an early Anglo-Saxon army. The text has been compiled by Dorothy Whitelock alongside other Anglo-Saxon documents. On chapter 51, it reads:

If a gesith-born man, who owns land, neglects military service, he is to give 120 shillings and to forfeit his land; one who holds no, 60 shillings, a ceorl 30 shillings, as a fine for [neglect of] military service.

This has been taken to prove that fyrd service extended to ceorls, or common freemen. Frank Stenton argued that as military defeat risked slavery, commoners would reasonably attempt to militarily resist an invasion. The average fighting man could well be as militarily outfitted as an undistinguished knight, as shown by recorded attempts to increase the quality of the fyrd by decreasing its manpower. Sometime between 799 and 802, Coenwulf of Mercia granted one of his followers an estate of 30 hides to furnish five men in wartime. The historian Eric John argued that common fyrd service amounted to no more than supplying the king's aristocratic warband. Richard Abels identifies a privileged class of peasantry known in Wessex as gafolgeldan or geburas which were under the king's protection as his followers would be and served in his army.

The household troops would have fought separately from the fyrd. In battle, they would fight near their lord or in the most exposed areas of battle, intended to both act as bodyguards in battle and be an example to the possibly less enthusiastic levies in a lord's army. There is evidence that the hearthwerod and similar unit types would deploy in a wedge formation. These professional warriors would bear the brunt of the frontline fighting. Warriors were expected to be brave, but headlong aggression and recklessness was frowned upon as much as timidity. For example, the Maldon poet gives a stylised story of the deaths of Byrhtnoth's followers in battle after he himself had been slain.

A lord's hearthwerod acted as his bodyguard, following him around even in civilian contexts for protection. Beyond that purpose, they were messengers and errand-men, could be sent to retrieve supplies and to act as negotiators. Royal "errand-bearers" carried royal orders and edicts, and collected the king's dues. Lords legally protected their men and were compensated if they were harmed. It was common for them to assist their men even in violating the law without facing consequences. This last point was controversial, and Ine attempted to regulate it in chapter 50 of his laws, mandating that lords restrain their men. Kings like Ine exercised power through their nobles rather than independently of them.

== Later history ==
There are recorded instances of Anglo-Saxon kings consulting their house-men before converting to Christianity. Edwin of Northumbria, according to Bede, was willing to convert, but first, needed to consult his "loyal chief men and counselors" so that they could convert with him. The co-dependent relationship between 7th-century kings and their hearthwerod necessitated their inclusion. However, one of the effects of conversion was a reduction in the amount of land available to the expecting king's retainers, which was instead given to the church.

Pollington believes that Christianisation weakened the system of the warband. Monasteries represented a new opportunity to accrue wealth, causing fewer men to risk their lives in the military. To address the issue, Mercian kings placed three "common burdens" on all landed estates: maintenance of fortifications, work on bridges, and army service. That said, the relationship between a king and his household warriors is not known to have died out. To Abels, it was still necessary in the seventh and eighth centuries that a king or lord secure loyal companions. In Beowulf, possibly composed in the 8th century, this ideal is described: "his companions will support him, serve their prince in battle".

In the late 9th century, Alfred the Great reformed the thanage, enforcing literacy standards. The worth thegn literally meant "one who serves" in Old English. (Note: Thegns were also widely known as gesiths until the 10th century.) The standard of five hides was defined in the legal tract Geþyncðu, written sometime between 1002 and 1023 by Wulfstan, Archbishop of York, as well as more broadly how a common man may attain thegnly status. Cnut the Great invaded England in 1016, during which he defeated Edmund Ironside at the Battle of Assandun and received the rest of the kingdom after Edmund's death before the end of the year. With him he brought the Housecarls, who were previously thought to have been governed by their own code called the Witherlogh. Although they were probably disciplined in some way, the Witherlogh was a 12th-century source and probably had more to do with royal power in 12th-century Denmark. The Housecarls were probably just the Danish equivalent to the Anglo-Saxon kingly retinue. Though future Housecarls would for the most part be recruited in England, the name remained.

== See also ==
- Anglo-Saxon Warfare
- Comitatus
- Hird
- Thingmen
- Fyrd
- Druzhina

== Sources ==
- Abels, Richard P. (2008). "Household Men, Mercenaries and Vikings in Anglo-Saxon England". In J. France (ed.). Mercenaries and Paid Men: The Mercenary Identity in the Middle Ages. Leiden: Brill. pp. 143–165. ISBN 978-90-04-16447-5.
- Abels, Richard (1988). Lordship and Military Obligation in Anglo-Saxon England. Berkeley, California: University of California Press. ISBN 978-0-520-05794-4.
- Bately, Janet (1991). The Anglo-Saxon Chronicle: Texts and Textual Relationships. Reading, UK: Reading Medieval Studies. ISBN 978-0-7049-0449-1.
- Crossley-Holland, Kevin (1999). The Anglo-Saxon World: an Anthology. Oxford University Press. ISBN 0192835475.
- Fee, Christopher (1996). ""Beag & Beaghroden": Women, treasure and the language of social structure in "Beowulf"". Neuphilologische Mitteilungen. 97 (3). Modern Language Society: 285–294. JSTOR 43346397.
- D'Amato, Raffaele; Pollington, Stephen (2023). Anglo-Saxon Kings and Warlords AD 400–1070. Illustrated by Raffaele Ruggeri. Bloomsbury Publishing. ISBN 9781472855350.
- Hollister, Charles Warren (1962). Anglo-Saxon Military Institutions on the Eve of the Norman Conquest. Oxford University Press.
- Hooper, Nicholas (1992). "The Housecarls in England in the 11th Century". In Strickland, Matthews (ed.). Anglo-Norman warfare: studies in late Anglo-Saxon and Anglo-Norman military organization and warfare. Woodbridge: Boydell & Brewer. ISBN 978-0-85115-328-5.
- Keynes, Simon (2014). "Thegn". In Lapidge, Michael; Blair, John; Keynes, Simon; Scragg, Donald (eds.). The Wiley Blackwell Encyclopedia of Anglo-Saxon England (2nd ed.). Chichester, West Sussex: Wiley Blackwell. pp. 459–461. ISBN 978-0-470-65632-7.
- Lawson, M. K. (2004). "Edmund II". Oxford Dictionary of National Biography (online ed.). Oxford University Press. doi:10.1093/ref:odnb/8502. (Subscription, Wikipedia Library access or UK public library membership required.)
- Loyn, HR (1955). "Gesiths and Thegns in Anglo-Saxon England from the Seventh to Tenth Century". The English Historical Review. 70 (277): 529–549. doi:10.1093/ehr/LXX.CCLXXVII.529. JSTOR 558038.
- Miller, Sean (2014). "Housecarl". In Lapidge, Michael; Blair, John; Keynes, Simon; Scragg, Donald (eds.). The Wiley Blackwell Encyclopedia of Anglo-Saxon England (2nd ed.). Chichester, West Sussex: Wiley Blackwell. p. 248. ISBN 978-0-470-65632-7.
- Pollington, Stephen (2001). The English Warrior: From Earliest Times to 1066. Anglo-Saxon Books. ISBN 1898281106.
- Stenton, Frank (1971). Anglo-Saxon England (3rd ed.). Oxford, UK: Oxford University Press. ISBN 978-0-19-821716-9.
- Tyler, Damian (2007). "Reluctant Kings and Christian Conversion in Seventh-Century England". History. 92 (306): 144–161. doi:10.1111/j.1468-229X.2007.00389.x. ISSN 0018-2648.
- Whitelock, Dorothy (1955). English Historical Documents v.l. c.500–1042. London: Eyre & Spottiswoode.
- Whitelock, Dorothy; Douglas, David; Tucker, Susie, eds. (1961). The Anglo-Saxon Chronicle. London, UK: Eyre and Spottiswoode. OCLC 317315404.
- Williams, Ann (2008). The World Before Domesday: The English Aristocracy 871-1066. A&C Black. ISBN 978-1-84725-239-5.
- Yorke, Barbara (1990). Kings and Kingdoms of Early Anglo-Saxon England. London and New York: Routledge. ISBN 978-0-415-16639-3.
