= Egtved =

- Village
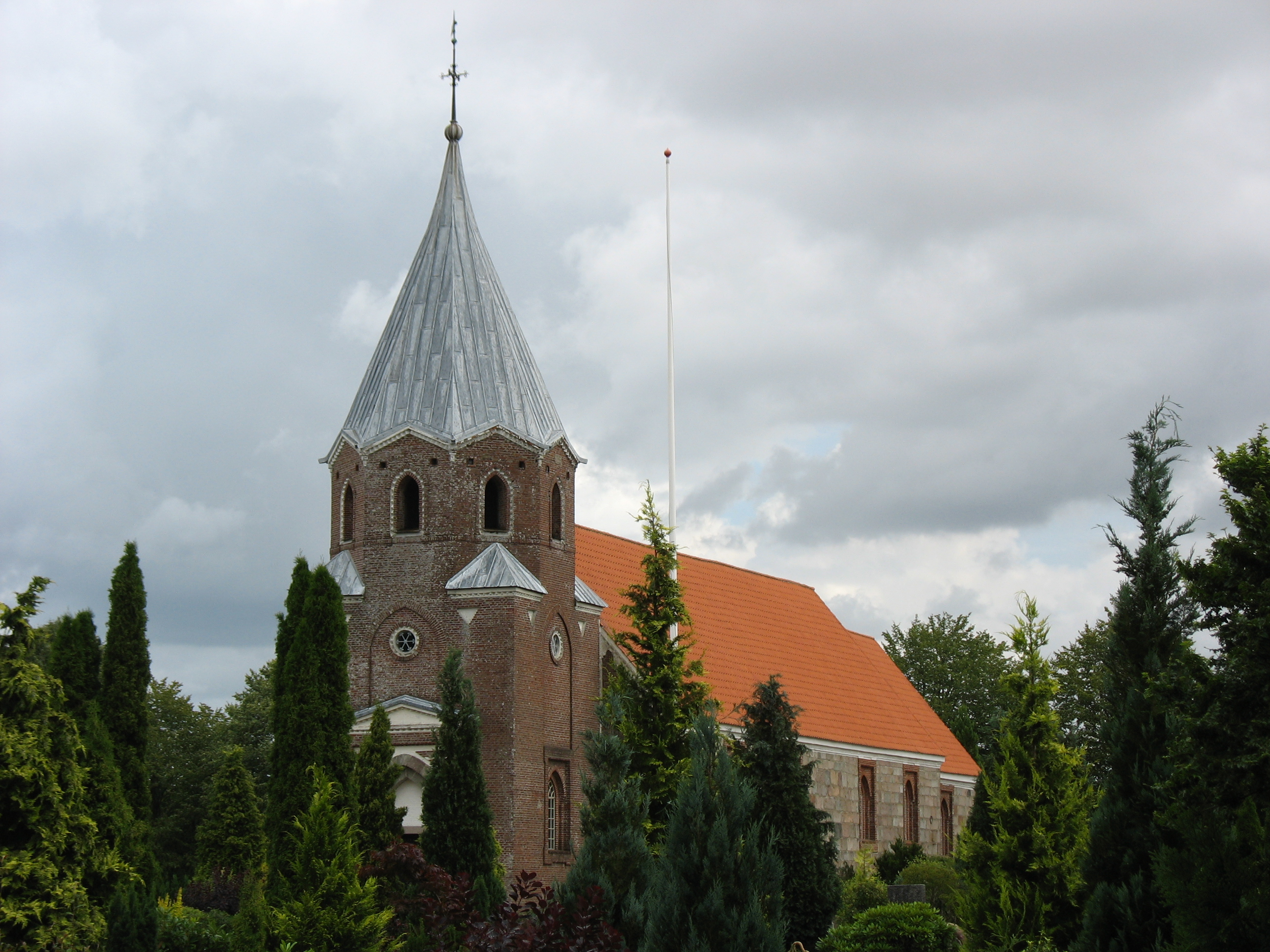
- Church in Egtved

- Location in Denmark Egtved (Region of Southern Denmark)
- Coordinates: 55°37′00″N 9°18′00″E
- Country: Denmark
- Region: Region Syd
- Municipality: Vejle
- Foundation: Pre-history (unknown)

Area
  - Urban: 1.81 km^{2} (0.70 sq mi)

Population (1 January 2026)
  - Urban: 2,408
  - Urban density: 1,330/km^{2} (3,450/sq mi)
- Time zone: UTC+1 (CET)
  - Summer (DST): UTC+2 (CEST)
- Postal code: DK-6040 Egtved

Egtved is a village with a population of 2,408 (as of 1 January 2026) near Vejle, Denmark in Vejle municipality in the Danish Region of Southern Denmark. Nearby is Tørskind Gravel Pit, a sculpture park.

The village has a Romanesque church built in 1170, to which a tower was added in 1863. The Egtved Runestone, found near the church in 1863, is now on display in the church.

== Egtved Girl ==
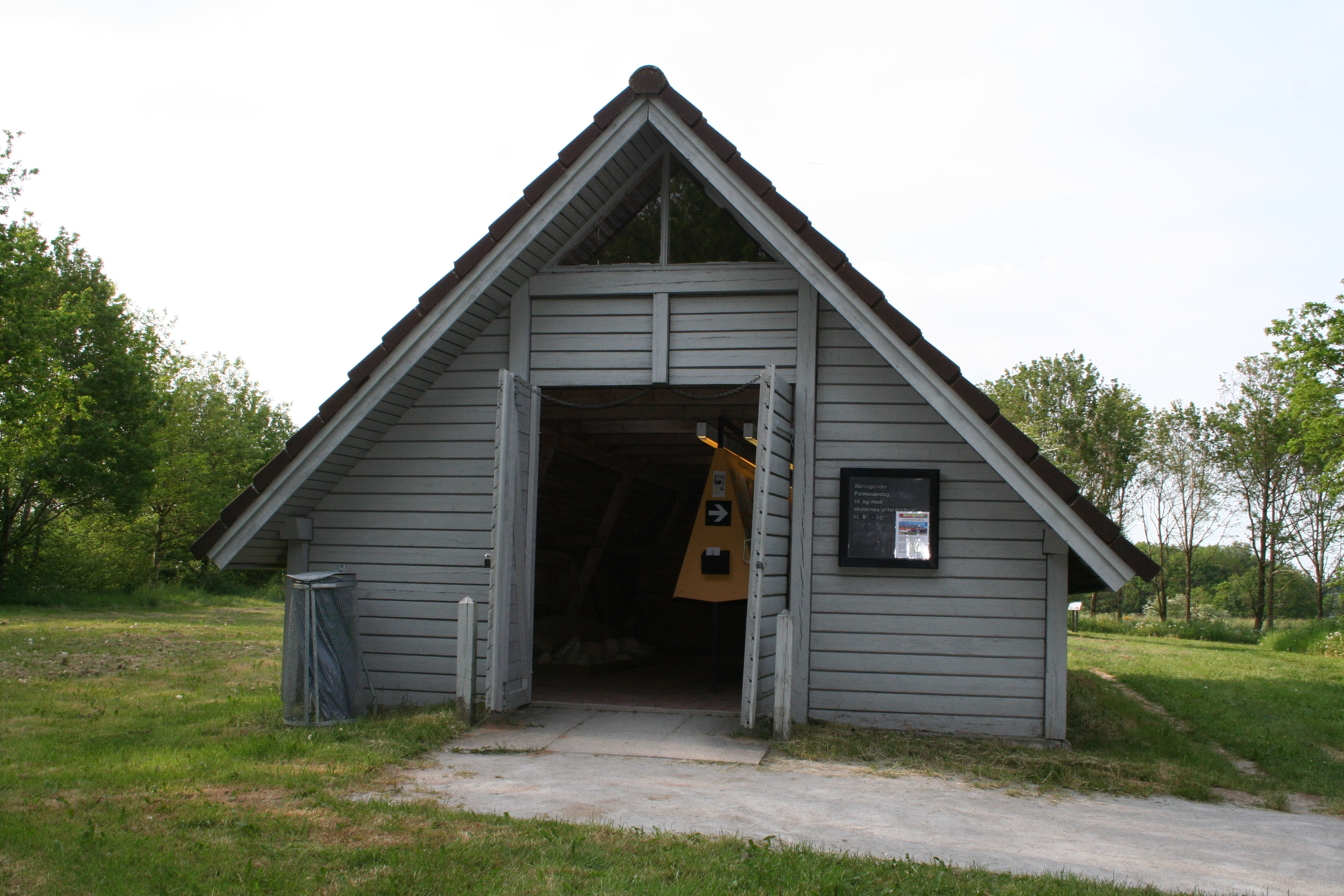
Egtved Girl museum

Near the village is a Bronze Age archaeological site (ca. 1370 BC) which contained an extremely well-preserved burial. It was discovered in 1921 and is one of the best preserved Bronze Age findings in Denmark. It contained the well preserved body of a girl known as the Egtved Girl. On the site where she was found a barrow with a diameter of 22 metres and a height of 4 metres was built. The teenaged girl was dressed in a string skirt, a short sleeved shirt with a woven belt, and a bronze spiked belt disc. She was laid on a cow-hide and covered by a coarse woollen blanket. Lying next to her was a birch-bark drink container with remnants of a drink made of bog myrtle, cranberries and honey.

There is also a small museum describing the discovery of the rare find in detail and displaying copies of the Egtved Girl's clothing, jewellery and buckle. This has allowed a very close look at Nordic Bronze Age clothing and hairstyles.

=== Literature ===
- C. Michael Hogan, Egtved Girl Barrow, The Megalithic Portal, editor A. Burnham, 4 October, 2007

== Notable people ==
- Poul Steenstrup (1772 in Egtved – 1864) a businessman, industrial entrepreneur and politician
- Peter Sørensen Vig (1854 in Bøgvad, Egtved Sogn – 1929) a Danish-American pastor, educator and historian in the Lutheran church
- Olaf Pedersen (1920 in Egtved – 1997) an authority on astronomy in classical antiquity and the Latin Middle Ages
- Mette Gravholt (born 1984 in Egtved) a retired Danish handball player who played 53 games for Denmark
