= Olaf Pedersen =

Danish historian of astronomy (1920–1997)

- Born: 8 April 1920; Egtved, Jutland, Denmark
- Died: 3 December 1997 (aged 77)
- Occupation: Historian of science

Olaf Pedersen (8 April 1920 – 3 December 1997) was a Danish historian of science who was "leading authority on astronomy in classical antiquity and the Latin middle ages."

Pedersen was active in the journal Centaurus, the Steno Museum, the International Union of History and Philosophy of Science, and the International Academy of the History of Science.

== Biography ==
Olaf Pedersen was born in Egtved, Jutland, Denmark. At the University of Copenhagen he studied in Niels Bohr’s institute, graduating in 1943 when the country was occupied by German forces. He began his teaching career in Randers, Jutland, teaching physics. He entered scholarship studying the philosophy and history of ideas. After the war he studied with Etienne Gilson in Paris. Returning to Denmark, he obtained a doctorate for work on Nicole Oresme in 1956, when he became a lecturer at Aarhus University.

In 1965 a department for history of science was formed at Aarhus. "The staff of the department, including Pedersen, taught science as well as history of science, and though this diluted their research it kept them in contact with science and maintained their bona fides among science colleagues." In 1967 Pedersen became a professor in this department.

After an operation on his heart, Olaf Pedersen died December 3, 1997.

== Works ==
=== Oresme ===
In 1956 the Munksgaard publishing house issued a 290 page volume for Acta historica scientariarum naturalium et medicinalium (volume #13) on Nicole Oresme: Nicole Oresme og hans naturfilosofiske system: en undersogelse af hans skrift "Le livre du ciel et du monde".

=== Early Physics and Astronomy ===
In 1974 Pedersen collaborated with Pihl Mogens to write Early Physics and Astronomy: A Historical Introduction where they speculated about a Latin translation of Ptolemy's Almagest by Boethius that has been lost: "Had it been preserved, Latin astronomy would not have been compelled to start with a delay of more than 700 years." (page 188) Reviewer George Saliba commented, "One would prefer that such statements were not written, for they reflect on a vision of history that makes the development of science depend on such haphazard accidents,..."

Pedersen also published An Survey of the Almagest (1974).

=== The First Universities ===
Pedersen described his take on the history of European universities in The First Universities (1997), which received several scholarly reviews:

A favorable review was given by DR Jones: [Pedersen] "develops a complex explanation of the nature of the university, if not a theory of causation. His first universities are shaped by interweaving requirements of subject matter, teaching methods, legal and organizational means, and requirements of society and state." Ian P. Wei gave the book an enthusiastic review, calling it a "clear and lively work of synthesis." He wrote that the "main thrust of the book is to present medieval universities as institutions which can only be understood in relation to broader political and social developments. Particular emphasis is laid on the significance of the struggles between popes and emperors, and on Roman law. The book’s greatest strength is its extraordinary breadth of vision."

On the other hand, Ruth Karras wrote, "this book begins, not as a history of universities, but as a history of learning." Her opinion was that a "more balanced view for both medievalists and non-specialists" was provided by volume one of A History of the University in Europe (1992), edited by Hilde Ridder-Symoens. Marcia L. Colish described the book as "a superficial and shaky sketch of what universities actually taught. He emphasizes the organization, not the content of education." Colish finds Pedersen prone to "repeat and compound factual errors more recently given the decent burial they deserve." She suggests other, more reliable, authorities.

A balanced review was given by H. E. J. Cowdrey: "Perhaps the most valuable chapters of the book are those which concern the classical inheritance of medieval higher education and the transition from ancient science to monistic learning." On the other hand, Cowdrey notes a "disconcerting number of factual errors", "too much attention is given to relatively unimportant topics", and "very little account indeed has been taken of scholarly work published since the early 1970s."

== Articles ==
- 1963: "The 'Philomaths' of 19th-century England", Centaurus 8(1)
- 1963: "Master John Perks and his Mechanical Curves", Centaurus 8(1)
- 1969: "Sagredo's Optical Researches", Centaurus 13(2)
- 1985: (with Bjarne Hulden and Kate Larsen) "Aage Gerhardt Drachmann (1891 to 1980): a bibliography", Centaurus 28(2)
