= Tørskind Gravel Pit =

Sculpture park in Denmark

Coordinates: 55°38′54.92″N 9°16′43.16″E

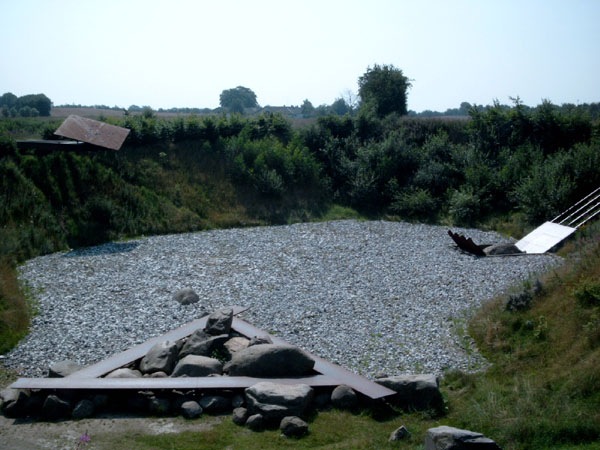
Tørskind sculptures

Tørskind Gravel Pit (Tørskind Grusgrav) is a former gravel pit converted into a sculpture park near Egtved, Vejle, Denmark. The sculptures were created by Robert Jacobsen (1912–1993) and Jean Clareboudt (1944–1997) over five years from 1986 to 1991. The park features works made of steel, granite and timber.
