= Hällestad Church =

- Hällestads kyrka
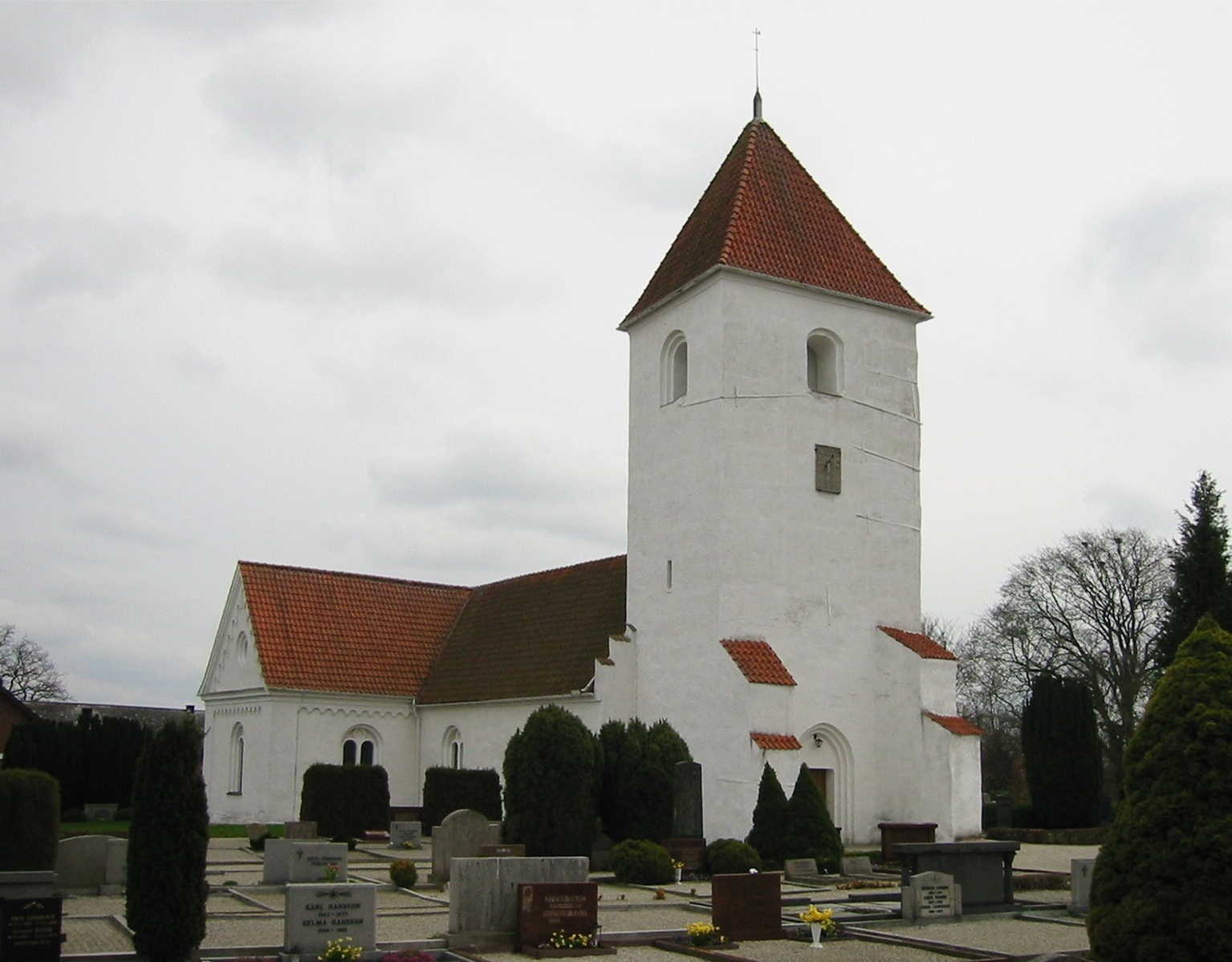
- Hofterup Church

- 55°40′39″N 13°25′14″E
- Country: Sweden
- Denomination: Church of Sweden

Hällestad Church (Swedish: Hällestads kyrka) is a medieval Lutheran church in Torna Hällestad in the province of Scania, Sweden. It belongs to the Diocese of Lund.

== History and architecture ==
The church probably dates from the 12th century, but little remains of the original church building due to subsequent reconstructions throughout the centuries. The choir and the transepts seen today date from the 19th century. Immured in the church are three runestones from the 11th century, the so-called Hällestad Runestones. The church is also notable for its rich internal decoration of medieval murals. These date from circa 1460 and executed by Nils Håkansson.
