= Danish Runic Inscription 154 =

Viking Age runestone

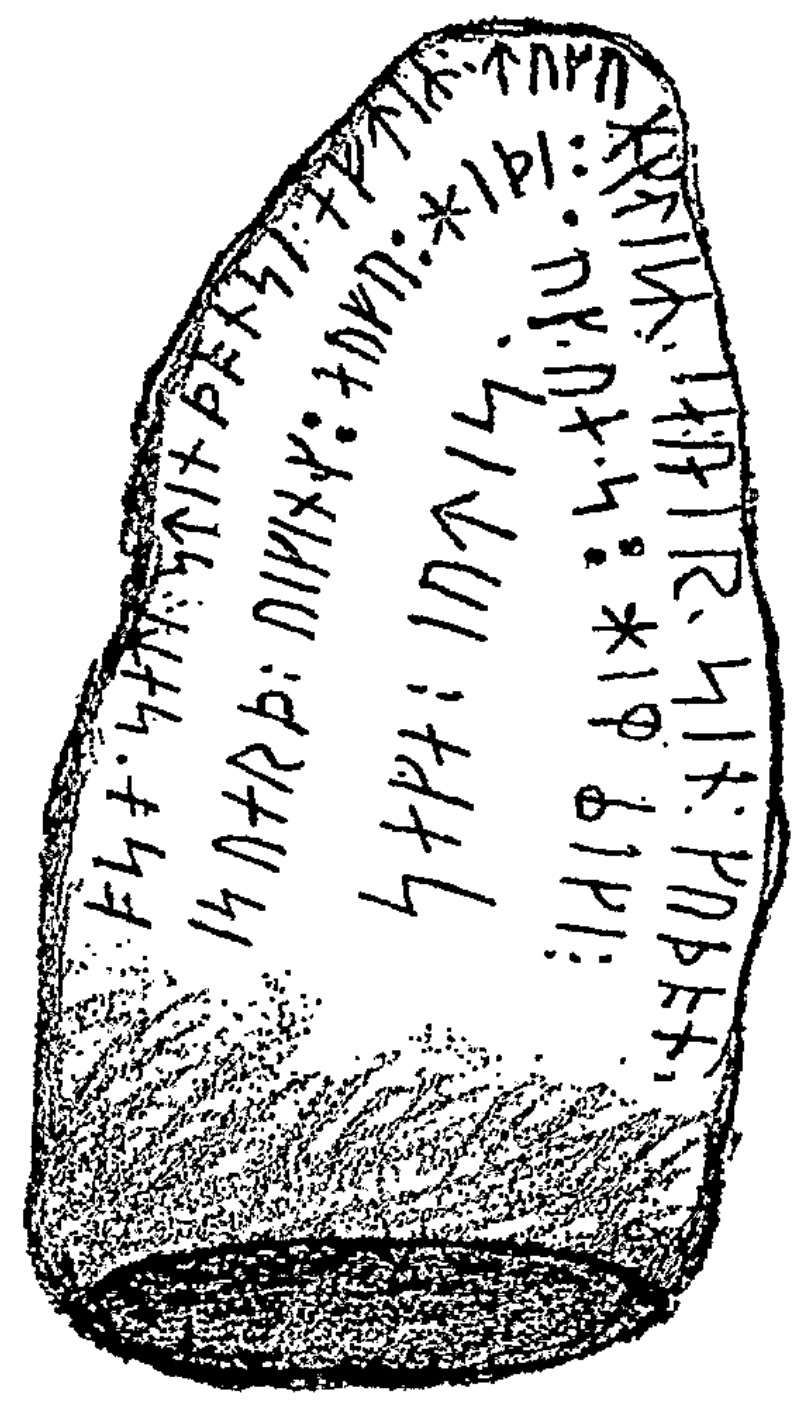

The Tvorup/Torup stone or DR 154 † was a Viking Age runestone engraved in Old Norse with the Younger Futhark runic alphabet, which has disappeared. According to Skonvig the stone would have been located just inside the door of church of Torup, having been moved there from a mound east of the church. The stone must have been lost while being transported to Copenhagen because nothing more is known about it. Skonvig reported that the stone was 2.5 Danish ells high and 1 ell wide. It was made by the same runemaster who made DR 155 (the Sjørring stone), and Lerche Nielsen (2010:244f) suggests that the two stones may actually be the same stone. The stone is dated to the period 970–1020, and the style of the runestone was the runestone style RAK.

== Inscription ==
Transliteration of the runes into Latin characters

[(o)sa : sati : stin · þonsi : aftiʀ : tuku ----iʀ · -a : -ir · sin : kuþon · ¶ is uarþ : uikin · (o) : aufu:hiþi : ¶ · uk · ua:s : him(þ)iki (:) ¶ saga : iutis ·]

Old Norse transcription:

Asa satti sten þænsi æftiʀ <tuku> ... ... ... sin goþan, æs warþ wægin a <aufu>heþi ok was hemþægi <saga> <iutis>..

English translation:

"Ása placed this stone in memory of <tuku>, her good ... ... ... ; he was slaughtered (on) <aufu> heath and was <saga> <iuti>'s retainer "
