= Sjörup Runestone =

Swedish runestone

Coordinates: 55°26′28″N 13°38′09″E

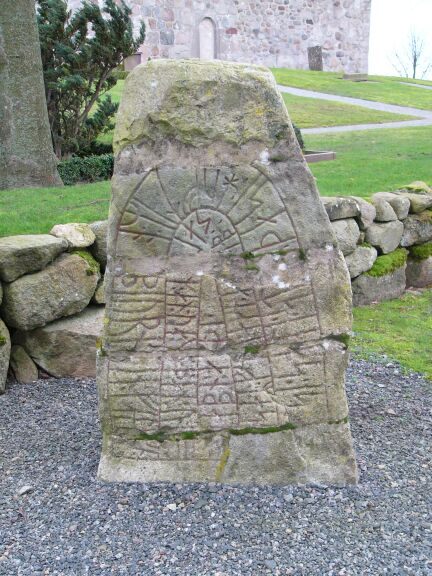
- Writing: Younger Futhark
- Created: c. 1000 AD
- Discovered: 1620s Sjörup, Skåne, Sweden
- Present location: Sjörup, Scania, Sweden
- Culture: Norse
- Rundata ID: DR 279
- Style: RAK
- Runemaster: Unknown

Text – Native
- Old Norse:See article

Translation
- See article

The Sjörup Runestone is a runestone in Scania, Sweden, from approximately 1000 AD that is classified as being in runestone style RAK. The Karlevi Runestone, the Egtved Runestone and the Hällestad Runestones may be connected to it.

== History ==
The Sjörup Runestone has been known by scholars since the 1620s when Jon Skonvig depicted it for Ole Worm's work on Danish runestones. Two centuries later, it was blown into six pieces to be reused as building material for a bridge. However, in the mid-1990s, the pieces were removed from the bridge and reassembled, and the repaired runestone was raised anew near the church of Sjörup.

== Form ==
The inscription begins on the bottom right and goes counter-clockwise around the runestone until it reaches the bottom left, and then it changes direction and goes below the first row, and finally it changes direction again until it finishes in the centre of the stone. The band principally follows the convolutions of a snake.

The runestone has some points in common with the runestone DR 295. Both runestones contain dotted k-runes and both runestones use the nasal ã-rune, although the Sjörup Runestone uses the ã-rune much more and has different orthography. For instance, the Old Norse word ægi ("not") is spelled aigi on the Hällestad Runestone while this stone spells it aki. The runemaster of this runestone drops the h-rune twice in the words han ("he") and hafði ("had"), but oddly, he adds an h-rune in beginning of the word æftiʀ ("in memory of"). This vacillating orthography shows that there was an insecurity in Viking Age Scandinavia as to whether the h-phoneme should be pronounced before a vowel, and so the h-rune was sometimes absent or even added where it usually did not belong. During the same time, diphthongs turned into monophthongs and an insecurity appeared as to how to spell vowels, because the runemaster had to make a phonemic analysis of the sounds that were to be represented in the inscription.

== Content ==
In all likelihood, the runestone tells of the same battle as the runestone DR 295. Both this runestone and the Hällestad Runestone use the phrase "He did not flee at Uppsala", and this runestone is raised in memory of Ásbjörn, the son of Tóki Gormsson. Saxi points out that Ásbjörn "slaughtered as long as he had a weapon", i.e. he fought until he was killed, and this means that Ásbjörn did not belong to those who were afraid of their foes and fled from the battle. The expression felaga means "fellow" and is related to félag "partnership," and it indicates that he belonged to a brotherhood based on strong bonds of friendship. There are four, or maybe five, runestones that talk of the same battle, and only the Ingvar Runestones consist of a greater number of stones that refer to a common event.

The personal name Ásbjôrn from the inscription means "Divine Bear" and has a name element related to the Æsir, the principle gods of Norse mythology.

== Historical context ==
Since both the Hällestad and the Sjörup runestones use the phrase "He did not flee at Uppsala", scholars since the 19th century have connected the runestones to the Battle of Fýrisvellir at Uppsala. Several medieval sources tell that the king of Sweden, Eric the Victorious, and his nephew Styrbjörn the Strong fought against each other on the Fýrisvellir in the 980s. Styrbjörn had been banished from Sweden, but became such a powerful Viking chieftain that he returned with a large host to have revenge and take the crown of Sweden.

When king Eric saw Styrbjörn land with his large army, he began to doubt his own ability to defeat them. During the night, he went to the temple of the Norse pagan god Odin and pledged to die in ten years time, if he was victorious against Styrbjörn. The following day, Odin struck Styrbjörn's warriors with blindness and most warriors fled. The Swedes hunted down the escaping foes and killed many of them, and after this battle, king Eric earned the name "the Victorious". The account that king Eric swore himself to Odin is of note since it takes place in Gamla Uppsala and according to Adam of Bremen (c. 1070), Uppsala had the Temple at Uppsala, which was the largest pagan temple of northern Europe.

== Inscription ==
[+ sa]ksi : sati : st[in] : þasi : huftiʀ : o[s]biurn : (s)in : fil(a)go ' ¶ (t)u-a[s : sun :] ¶ saʀ : flu : aki : a[t :] ub:sal(u)m : an : ua : maþ : an : u¶abn : a(f)þi
{} Saxi {} satti {} sten {} þæssi {} æftiʀ {} Æsbiorn, {} sin {} felaga, {} {} To[f]a/To[k]a {} sun. {} {} Saʀ {} flo {} ægi {} at {} Upsalum, {} æn {} wa {} mæþ {} han {} wapn {} hafþi.
Saxi placed this stone in memory of Ásbjôrn Tófi's/Tóki's son, his partner. He did not flee at Uppsala, but slaughtered as long as he had a weapon.
