= Johannes Brøndsted =

Danish archaeologist and prehistorian

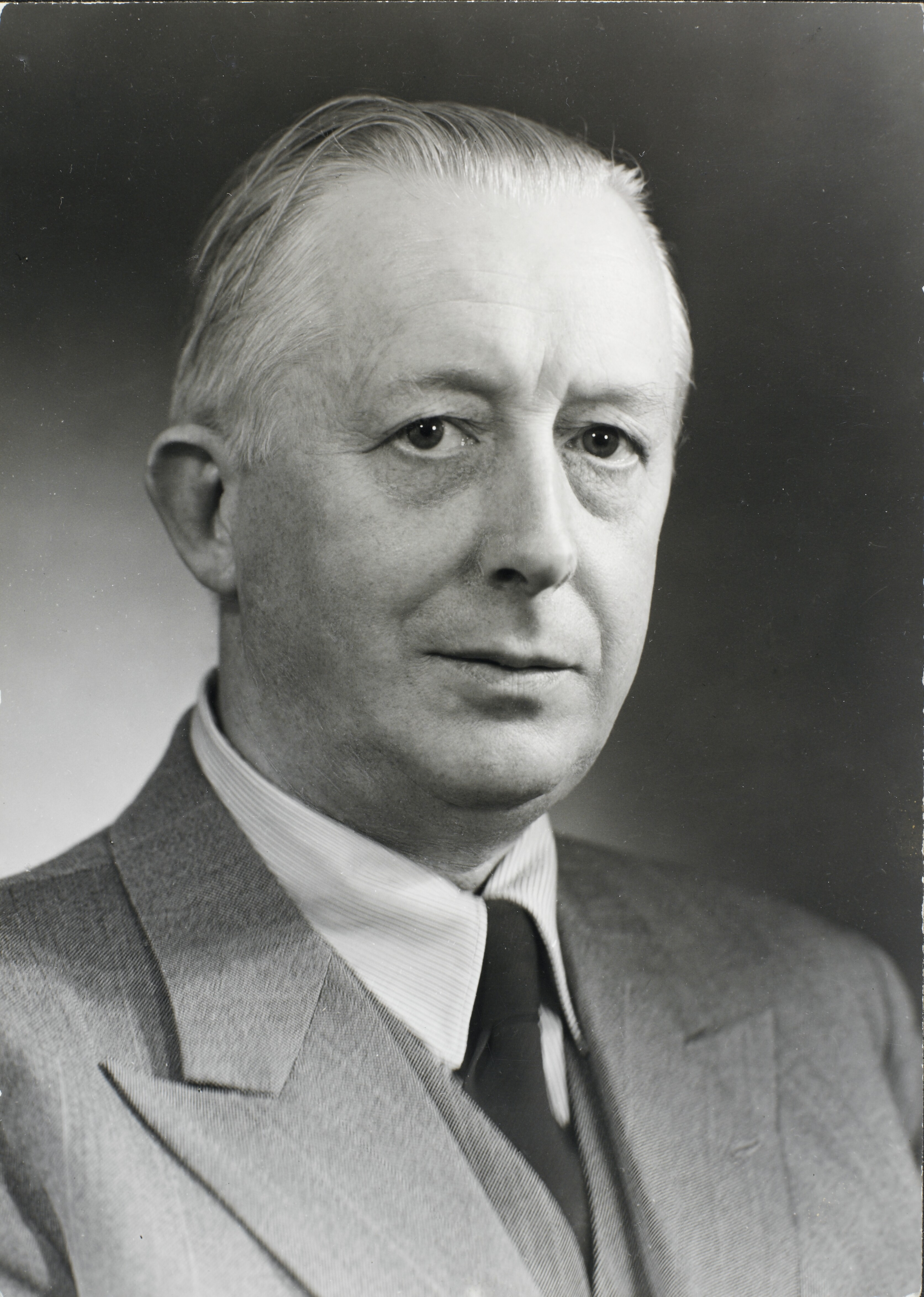
- Born: 5 October 1890; Grundfør, Denmark
- Died: 16 November 1965 (aged 75); Copenhagen, Denmark
- Education: University of Copenhagen
- Occupation: Director of the National Museum of Denmark
- Notable work: The Vikings (1960)
- Parents: Holger Brøndsted (father); Kristine Margrethe Bruun (mother)

Johannes Balthasar Brøndsted (5 October 1890 - 16 November 1965) was a Danish archaeologist and prehistorian. He was a professor at the University of Copenhagen and director of the National Museum of Denmark.

== Biography ==
Brøndsted was born at Grundfør in Jutland, Denmark. He was the son of Kristine Margrethe Bruun (1858–1899) and Holger Brøndsted (1849–1916). His father was a parish priest. In 1909, he took his matriculation examination at Sorø Academy, after which he briefly studied law and art history at the University of Copenhagen and took his examination in classical philology in 1916. In 1920, he received his doctorate for his work on the relations between Anglo-Saxon art and Norse art during the Viking era.

Brøndsted begins his work at the museum in 1917 and becomes deputy inspector at the National Museum Department of Nordic Antiquity in 1918. In 1922 and 1922, he worked in the field with Ejnar Dyggve (1887–1961) and excavated early Christian monuments in Dalmatia. His account of this excavation was published as Recherches à Salone (1928). He was a co-founder of the peer-reviewed academic journal Acta Archaeologica and editor-in-chief (1930–1948).

From 1941 through 1951, Brøndsted was a professor of Nordic archeology and European prehistory at the University of Copenhagen. He left this position to become the director of the National Museum of Denmark in Copenhagen, a position he held from 1951 through 1960.

Johannes Brøndsted died at Copenhagen and was buried at Frederiksberg Ældre Kirkegård in Frederiksberg.

== Selected works ==
- Recherches à Salone (1928)
- Danmarks Oldtid (three vols.; 2e; 1957–1959), a prehistory of Denmark
- The Vikings (1960) (English edition: trans. Kalle Skov; Penguin, Harmondsworth; 1965; ISBN 0-14-020459-8)

== Recognition and distinctions ==
- 1948 - Royal Swedish Academy of Sciences (ord. med.)
- 1948 - Cross of Honour of the Order of the Dannebrog
- 1952 - Corresponding Fellow of the British Academy
- 1953 - Gold medal of the Society of Antiquaries of London
