= List of monarchs of Denmark =

Royal Banner of the Kings of Denmark (c. 1300s).

This is a list of monarchs of Denmark, that is, the kings and queen regnants of Denmark. This includes:

- The Kingdom of Denmark (up to 1397)
  - Personal union of Denmark and Norway (1380–1397)
- The Kalmar Union (1397–1536)
  - Union of Denmark, Norway and Sweden (1397–1523)
  - Union of Denmark and Norway (1523–1536/1537)
- The United Kingdoms of Denmark–Norway (1536/1537–1814)
- The Kingdom of Denmark (1814–present)
  - Iceland (since the union between Denmark and Norway in 1380; independent kingdom in a personal union with Denmark 1918–1944; a sovereign republic since 1944)
  - Greenland (since the union between Denmark and Norway in 1380; effective Danish–Norwegian control began in 1721; integrated into the Danish Realm in 1953; internal home rule introduced 1979; self-rule assumed in 2009; Greenland has two out of 179 seats in the Danish parliament Folketinget)
  - Faroe Islands (since the union between Denmark and Norway in 1380; County of Denmark 1816–1948; internal home rule introduced 1948; The Faroe Islands have two out of 179 seats in the Danish parliament Folketinget)

The House of Oldenburg held the Danish Crown between 1448 and 1863, when it passed to the House of Glücksburg, a cadet branch of the same house, patrilineally descended from King Christian III of Denmark. The kingdom had been elective (although the eldest son or brother of the previous king was usually elected) until 1660 when it became hereditary and absolutist. Until 1864, Denmark was also united in a personal union with the duchies of Holstein and Saxe-Lauenburg (1815–1864), and in a political and personal union with the Duchy of Schleswig.

== Pre-Knýtlinga Danish monarchs ==
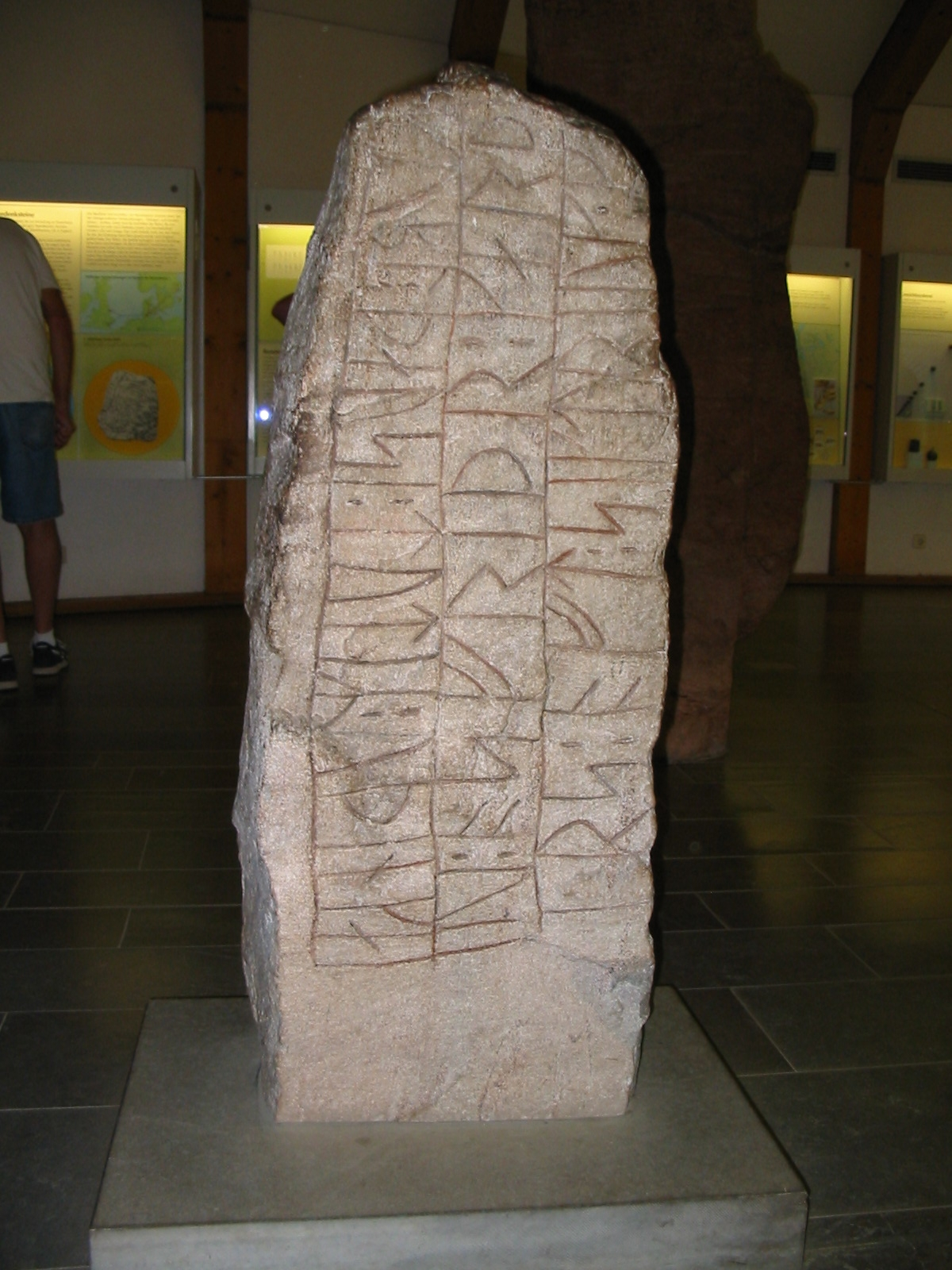
The Sigtrygg Runestones of the "House of Olaf" was raised after king Sigtrygg by his mother. 934 AD.

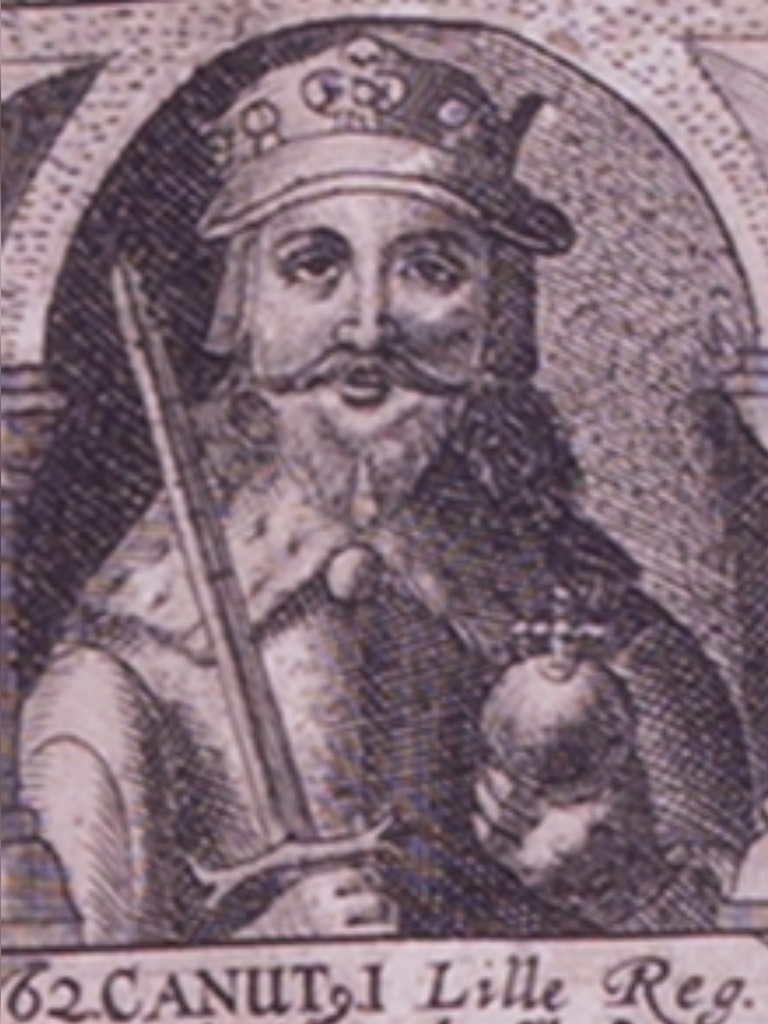
King Cnut I (Harthacnut). 17th century engraving.

The exact date of origin of the Kingdom of Denmark is not established, but names of Danish kings begins to emerge in foreign sources from the 8th century and onwards. Danish and Nordic legendary stories, chronicles and sagas often have accounts of Danish kings and dynasties stretching further back in time than the 7th century, but the historicity of the content and interpretations of these stories are often put to doubt.

- Chochilaicus—see Hugleik and Hygelac—c. 515 AD, mentioned by Gregory of Tours (538–594).
- Ongendus (Angantyr): c. 710 Saint Willibrord wrote about when he visited the Danes, at the time ruled by Ongendus.
- Harald, named as former king in relating 9th-century events, perhaps model for legendary Harald Wartooth. Related to the Frisian king Redbad II who in 754 had to flee to "the land of the Danes" where King Harald reigned ("Daniae Regi Heraldi").
- Sigfred: 770s–790s
- Gudfred: 804–810, mentioned as Danish king. Alternative spellings: Godfred, Göttrick (German), Godric(Anglicized English), Gøtrik (Danish), Gudrød (Danish)
- Hemming: 810–812.
- Sigfred, nephew of Gudfred, and Anulo (Anlaufr), grandson or nephew of Harald, fought for the throne and both were killed, perhaps model for the legendary Sigurd Hring: c. 812
- Harald Klak and his brothers Ragnfrid and Hemming Halfdansson: 812–813 and again from 819/827. From 826 he was in exile with Louis the Pious.
- Sons of Gudfred (Godrik): 814–820s
  - Horik I: (814) 827–854.
- Horik II: 854–860s.
- Late 9th century kings
  - Bagsecg: c. 860s–871
  - Halfdan: 871–877
  - Sigfred: c. 873–891.
  - Gudfred: 880s
  - Heiligo (Halga): 890s (?), described by Adam of Bremen as the immediate predecessor of the House of Olof.
- The "House of Olaf": late 9th century and early 10th century. This dynasty is described by Adam of Bremen, and members of this claimed dynasty are commemorated by the two Sigtrygg Runestones, which represent contemporary evidence that some of these kings controlled at least part of Denmark.
  - Olof, said by Adam to have come from Sweden and defeated Heiligo, taking the crown.
  - Gyrd and Gnupa, sons and joint successors of Olof, according to Adam. Gnupa is named by Widukind of Corvey as leader of the Danes in 934, and appears on the Sigtrygg Runestones. The Danish medieval annals, on the other hand, doesn't mention Gnupa at all, whereas Gyrd is stated in several of these annals as being a nephew of and successor to Olof.
  - Sigtrygg, son of Gnupa, memorialized on the Sigtrygg Runestones, presumably dating from shortly after 934.
- Eric the Victorious of Sweden mentioned by Adam of Bremen and Saxo Grammaticus as ruling Denmark after an invasion by Sweden together with Slavic warriors. Adam of Bremen got the information from Danish king Sweyn II. The Stone of Eric also describes an attack on Hedeby from the same period. Since Eric also, according to another source of Adam of Bremen, invaded the Holy Roman Empire. It virtually requires Eric to have been the king of Denmark. Therefore two independent sources describe Eric as the king of Denmark.

=== Semi-legendary kings ===
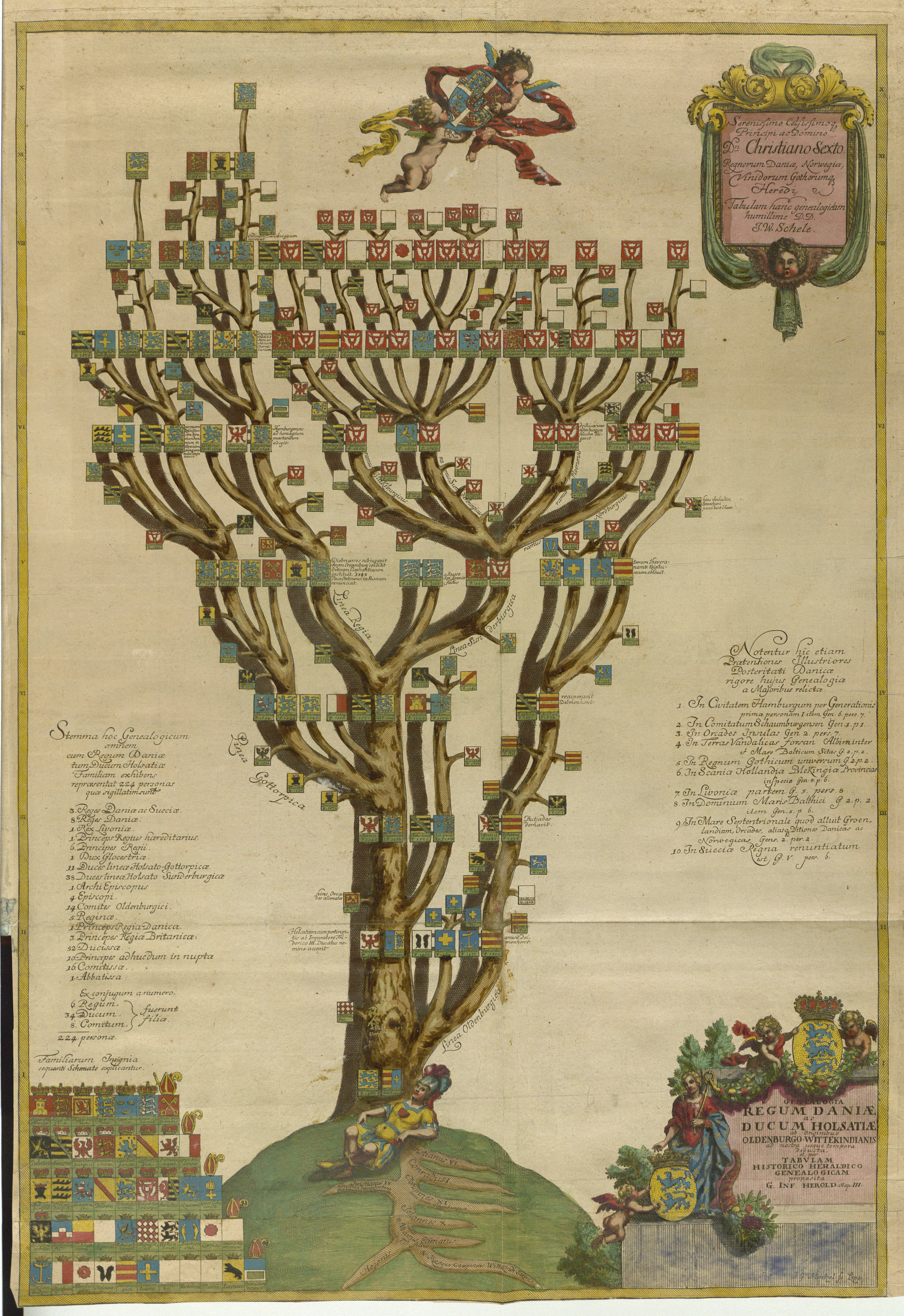
Genealogia Regum Daniæ.

- Ragnar Lodbrok, a legendary king probably in the 9th century, only appears in sagas and late histories, and these accounts are wildly inconsistent. He may be a composite character, a chimera of several historical kings and Vikings.
- Sigurd Snake-in-the-Eye (da: Sigurd Orm-i-øje or Snogeøje). Mentioned by late Chronicon Roskildense and Ragnarssona þáttr. Said to be king of Zealand and Scania, and son of Ragnar Lodbrok. He may be inspired by late 9th century King Sigfred (above).
- Harthacnut I (Hardeknud). According to the sagas he is son of Sigurd Snake-in-the-Eye, but some historians identify him with Adam's Hardegon, Svein's son, who invaded Denmark from Northmannia and supplanted the House of Olof. He may have ruled only part of Denmark, as Adam places the commencement of his long reign between 909 and 915, while the House of Olof was still ruling at least part of Denmark as late as 934. He was father of Gorm the Old.

== List of monarchs of Denmark ==
=== House of Gorm (c. 936–1042) ===
| Name | Portrait | Birth | Marriages | Death |
|---|---|---|---|---|
| Gorm the Old (Gorm den Gamle) by c. 936 – 958/64 | Non-contemporary | ? son of Harthacanute I | Thyra four children | 958/64 |
| Harald I Bluetooth (Harald Blåtand); 958/64–985/6 | Non-contemporary | 932 son of Gorm the Old and Thyra | (1) Gunhild (perhaps identical with Tove) (2) Tove of the Obotrites; January 963 (3) Gyrid of Sweden [legendary] | 1 November 985 (or 986 or 987); Jomsborg aged 53 |
| Sweyn I Forkbeard (Svend Tveskæg); 986–1014 | Non-contemporary | 17 April 963 son of Tove of the Obotrites and Harald Bluetooth | (1 & 2) Gunhild of Wenden and Sigrid the Haughty eight children | 3 February 1014; Gainsborough, Lincolnshire aged 50 |
| Harald II Svendsen; 1014–1018(?) | Non-contemporary | ? son of Sweyn Forkbeard and Gunhild | unknown | c. 1018 |
| Cnut II the Great (Knud den Store); 1019–1035 | | c. 985/95 son of Sweyn Forkbeard and Gunhild | (1) Ælfgifu of Northampton two children (2) Emma of Normandy; 2/31 July 1017 three children | 12 November 1035; Shaftesbury aged about 40–50 |
| Cnut III or Harthacnut III (Hardeknud); 1035–1042 | Non-contemporary | c. 1020; England son of Cnut the Great and Emma of Normandy | never married | 8 June 1042; Lambeth aged 21–22 |

=== House of Fairhair (1042–1047) ===
| Name | Portrait | Birth | Marriages | Death |
|---|---|---|---|---|
| Magnus the Good (Magnus den Gode); 1042–1047 | | c. 1024; Norway illegitimate son of Olaf II of Norway and Alfhild | never married one daughter | 25 October 1047; Zealand aged 23 |

=== House of Estridsen (1047–1375) ===
| Name | Portrait | Birth | Marriages | Death |
|---|---|---|---|---|
| Sweyn II Estridsson (Svend Estridsen); 1047–1076 | | c. 1019; England son of jarl Ulf Torgilsson and Estrid Svendsdatter (daughter of Sweyn I Forkbeard) | (1) Gyda of Sweden c. 1048 (2) Gunnhildr Sveinsdóttir c. 1050 | 28 April 1076; Søderup aged 57–58 |
| Harald III the Soft (Harald Hén); 1076–1080 | Non-contemporary | c. 1040 illegitimate son of Sweyn II | Margareta Hasbjörnsdatter no issue | 17 April 1080 aged 40 |
| Cnut IV the Holy (Knud den Hellige); 1080–1086 | Non-contemporary | c. 1042 illegitimate son of Sweyn II | Adela of Flanders c. 1080 three children | 10 July 1086; St. Alban's Priory aged 43–44 |
| Olaf I Hunger (Oluf Hunger); 1086–1095 | Non-contemporary | c. 1050 illegitimate son of Sweyn II | Ingegerd of Norway c. 1070 one daughter | 18 August 1095 aged 44–45 |
| Eric I Evergood (Erik Ejegod); 1095–1103 | Non-contemporary | c. 1060; Slangerup illegitimate son of Sweyn II | Boedil Thurgotsdatter before 1086 one son | 10 July 1103; Paphos, Cyprus aged 42–43 |
| Niels; 1104–1134 | Non-contemporary | c. 1065 illegitimate son of Sweyn II | (1) Margaret Fredkulla c. 1105 two sons (2) Ulvhild Håkansdotter c. 1130 no issue | 25 June 1134; Schleswig aged 68–69 |
| Eric II the Memorable (Erik Emune); 1134–1137 | Non-contemporary | c. 1090 illegitimate son of Eric I | Malmfred of Kiev c. 1130 no issue | 18 July 1137; Urnehoved aged 46–47 |
| Eric III Lamb (Erik Lam); 1137–1146 (abdicated) | Non-contemporary | c. 1120 son of Hakon Sunnivasson and Ragnhild Eriksdatter (she was daughter of Eric I) | Lutgard of Salzwedel c. 1144 no issue | 27 August 1146; St. Canute's Abbey aged 25–26 |
| Sweyn III Grathe (Svend Grathe); 1146–1157 | Non-contemporary | c. 1125 son of Eric II | Adela of Meissen c. 1152 two children | 23 October 1157; Grathe Heath aged 31–32 |
| Cnut V (Knud 5.); 1146–1157 | | c. 1129 eldest son of Magnus Nielsen and Richeza of Poland | Helena of Sweden c. 1156 no issue | 9 August 1157; Roskilde aged 27–28 |
| Valdemar I the Great (Valdemar den Store); 1154–1182 | | 14 January 1131 only son of Canute Lavard (who was son of Eric I) and Ingeborg of Kiev | Sophia of Minsk c. 1157; Viborg Cathedral eight children | 12 May 1182; Vordingborg Castle aged 51 |
| Cnut VI (Knud 6.); 1170–1202 | | c. 1163 eldest son of Valdemar I and Sophia of Minsk | Gertrude of Bavaria; February 1177; Lund Cathedral no issue | 12 November 1202 aged 38–39 |
| Valdemar II the Victorious (Valdemar Sejr); 1202–1241 | | 9 May/28 June 1170 second son of Valdemar I and Sophia of Minsk | (1) Dagmar of Bohemia c. 1205; Lübeck one son (2) Berengaria of Portugal; 18/24 May 1214 four children | 28 March 1241; Vordingborg Castle aged 70 |
| Valdemar the Young ("Valdemar III") (Valdemar den Unge); 1215–1231 | | c. 1209 only son of Valdemar II and Dagmar of Bohemia | Eleanor of Portugal; 24 June 1229; Ribe Cathedral one child | 28 November 1231; Refsnæs aged 21–22 |
| Eric IV Ploughpenny (Erik Plovpenning); 1232–1250 | | c. 1216 eldest son of Valdemar II and Berengaria of Portugal | Jutta of Saxony; 17 November 1239 six children | 9 August 1250 on the Schlei aged 33–34 |
| Abel; 1 November 1250 – 1252 | Non-contemporary | c. 1218 second son of Valdemar II and Berengaria of Portugal | Matilda of Holstein; 25 April 1237; Schleswig Cathedral four children | 29 June 1252; Eiderstedt aged 33–34 |
| Christopher I (Christoffer 1.); 25 December 1252 – 1259 | Non-contemporary | c. 1219 third son of Valdemar II and Berengaria of Portugal | Margaret Sambiria c. 1248 five children | 29 May 1259; Ribe aged 39–40 |
| Eric V Klipping (Erik Klipping); 1259–1286 | | c. 1249 eldest son of Christopher I and Margaret Sambiria | Agnes of Brandenburg; 11 November 1273; Schleswig Cathedral seven children | 22 November 1286; Finderup aged 36–37 |
| Eric VI Menved (Erik Menved); 1286–1319 | | c. 1274 eldest son of Eric V and Agnes of Brandenburg | Ingeborg of Sweden; June 1296; Kärnan Castle fourteen children | 13 November 1319; Roskilde aged 44–45 |
| Christopher II (Christoffer 2.); 25 January 1320 – 1326 (deposed) | | 29 September 1276 second son of Eric V and Agnes of Brandenburg | Euphemia of Pomerania c. 1300 six children | 2 August 1332; Nykøbing Castle aged 55 |
| Eric (Erik Christoffersen); 1321–1326 (deposed) | | c. 1307 eldest son of Christopher II and Euphemia of Pomerania | Elizabeth of Holstein-Rendsburg; 1330 no issue | early 1332 aged approximately 25 |
| Valdemar III (Valdemar 3.); 1326–1329 (deposed) | Non-contemporary | c. 1314 only son of Eric II, Duke of Schleswig and Adelaide of Holstein-Rendsburg | Richardis of Schwerin two sons | c. 1364 aged 49–50 |
| Christopher II (Christoffer 2.); 1329–1332 (restored) | | 29 September 1276 second son of Eric V and Agnes of Brandenburg | Euphemia of Pomerania c. 1300 six children | 2 August 1332; Nykøbing Castle aged 55 |
| Eric (Erik Christoffersen); 1329–1331/32 | | c. 1307 eldest son of Christopher II and Euphemia of Pomerania | Elizabeth of Holstein-Rendsburg; 1330 no issue | late 1331 or early 1332 aged approximately 25 |
Interregnum (1332–1340)
| Valdemar IV Atterdag (Valdemar Atterdag); 21 June 1340 – 1375 | | c. 1320 third son of Christopher II and Euphemia of Pomerania | Helvig of Schleswig c. 1340; Sønderborg Castle six children | 24 October 1375; Gurre Castle aged 54–55 |

=== House of Bjälbo (1376–1387) ===
| Name | Portrait | Birth | Marriages | Death |
|---|---|---|---|---|
| Olaf II (Oluf 2.); 3 May 1376 – 1387 | Non-contemporary | December 1370; Akershus Castle only son of King Haakon VI of Norway and Sweden and Margaret I | never married | 3 August 1387; Falsterbo Castle aged 16 |

=== House of Estridsen (1387–1412) ===
| Name | Portrait | Birth | Marriages | Death |
|---|---|---|---|---|
| Margaret I (Margrete 1.); 1387–1412 (de facto) | | c. 1353; Søborg Castle youngest daughter of Valdemar IV and Helvig of Schleswig | Haakon VI of Norway; 9 April 1363; Church of Our Lady one son | 28 October 1412; Ship on Flensburg Fjord aged 58–59 |

=== House of Griffin (1396–1439) ===
| Name | Portrait | Arms | Birth | Marriage(s) | Death |
|---|---|---|---|---|---|
| Eric VII (Erik af Pommern); 24 January 1412 – 1439 (deposed) | | | c. 1381/82; Rügenwalde Castle (Poland) only son of Polish Duke of Pomerania Wartislaw VII and Mary of Mecklenburg-Schwerin | Philippa of England; 26 October 1406; Lund Cathedral no issue | 24 September 1459; Rügenwalde Castle (Poland) aged 76–78 |

=== House of Wittelsbach, Palatinate-Neumarkt branch (1440–1448) ===
| Name | Portrait | Arms | Birth | Marriage(s) | Death |
|---|---|---|---|---|---|
| Christopher III (Christoffer af Bayern); 9 April 1440 – 5/6 January 1448 | | | 26 February 1416; Neumarkt in der Oberpfalz fifth son of John, Count Palatine of Neumarkt and Catherine of Pomerania | Dorothea of Brandenburg; 12 September 1445; Copenhagen no issue | 5/6 January 1448; Kärnan Castile aged 31 |

=== House of Oldenburg (1448–1863) ===
| Name | Portrait | Arms | Birth | Marriage(s) | Death |
|---|---|---|---|---|---|
| Christian I 1 September 1448 – 21 May 1481 (32 years, 263 days) | | | February 1426; Oldenburg eldest son of Dietrich, Count of Oldenburg and Hedvig of Holstein | Dorothea of Brandenburg; 28 October 1449; Church of Our Lady five children | 21 May 1481; Copenhagen Castle aged 55 |
| John (Hans); 21 May 1481 – 20 February 1513 (31 years, 276 days) | | | 2 February 1455; Aalborghus Castle third son of Christian I and Dorothea of Brandenburg | Christina of Saxony; 6 September 1478; Copenhagen five children | 20 February 1513; Aalborghus Castle aged 58 |
| Christian II; 22 July 1513 – 20 January 1523 (9 years, 183 days) (deposed) | | | 1 July 1481; Nyborg Castle second son of John and Christina of Saxony | Isabella of Austria; 12 August 1515; Copenhagen six children | 25 January 1559; Kalundborg Castle aged 77 |
| Frederick I 13 April 1523 – 10 April 1533 (9 years, 363 days) | | | 7 October 1471; Haderslevhus Castle fourth son of Christian I and Dorothea of Brandenburg | (1) Anna of Brandenburg; 10 April 1502; Stendal two children (2) Sophie of Pomerania; 9 October 1518; Kiel Castle six children | 10 April 1533; Gottorp Castle aged 61 |
Interregnum (1533–1534)
| Christian III; 4 July 1534 – 1 January 1559 (24 years, 182 days) | | | 12 August 1503; Gottorp Castle only son of Frederick I and Anna of Brandenburg | Dorothea of Saxe-Lauenburg; 29 October 1525; Lauenburg Castle five children | 1 January 1559; Koldinghus Castle aged 55 |
| Frederick II; 1 January 1559 – 4 April 1588 (29 years, 95 days) | | | 1 July 1534; Haderslevhus Castle eldest son of Christian III and Dorothea of Saxe-Lauenburg | Sophie of Mecklenburg-Güstrow; 20 July 1572; Copenhagen eight children | 4 April 1588; Antvorskov Castle aged 53 |
| Christian IV; 4 April 1588 – 28 February 1648 (59 years, 331 days) | | | 12 April 1577; Frederiksborg Palace eldest son of Frederick II and Sophie of Mecklenburg-Güstrow | (1) Anne Catherine of Brandenburg; 27 November 1597; Haderslevhus Castle seven children (2) Kirsten Munk; 31 December 1615; Copenhagen twelve children | 28 February 1648; Rosenborg Castle aged 70 |
| Frederick III; 6 July 1648 – 9 February 1670 (21 years, 219 days) | | | 18 March 1609; Haderslevhus Castle third son of Christian IV and Anne Catherine of Brandenburg | Sophie Amalie of Brunswick-Lüneburg; 1 October 1643; Glücksburg Castle eight children | 9 February 1670; Copenhagen Castle aged 60 |
| Christian V 9 February 1670 – 25 August 1699 (29 years, 198 days) | | | 15 April 1646; Duborg Castle eldest son of Frederick III and Sophie Amalie of Brunswick-Lüneburg | Charlotte Amalie of Hesse-Kassel; 25 June 1667; Nykøbing Castle eight children | 25 August 1699; Copenhagen Castle aged 53 |
| Frederick IV; 25 August 1699 – 12 October 1730 (31 years, 49 days) | | | 11 October 1671; Copenhagen Castle eldest son of Christian V and Charlotte Amalie of Hesse-Kassel | (1) Louise of Mecklenburg-Güstrow; 5 December 1695; Copenhagen five children (2) Elisabeth Helene von Vieregg; 6 September 1703 one son (3) Anne Sophie Reventlow; 4 April 1721; Copenhagen three children | 12 October 1730; Odense Palace aged 59 |
| Christian VI; 12 October 1730 – 6 August 1746 (15 years, 299 days) | | | 30 November 1699; Copenhagen Castle second son of Frederick IV and Louise of Mecklenburg-Güstrow | Sophia Magdalene of Brandenburg-Kulmbach; 7 August 1721; Pretzsch Castle three children | 6 August 1746; Hirschholm Palace aged 46 |
| Frederick V 6 August 1746 – 14 January 1766 (19 years, 162 days) | | | 31 March 1723; Copenhagen Castle only son of Christian VI and Sophia Magdalene of Brandenburg-Kulmbach | (1) Louise of Great Britain; 11 December 1743; Altona five children (2) Juliana Maria of Brunswick-Wolfenbüttel; 8 July 1752; Frederiksborg Palace one son | 14 January 1766; Christiansborg Palace aged 42 |
| Christian VII; 14 January 1766 – 13 March 1808 (42 years, 60 days) | | | 29 January 1749; Christiansborg Palace second son of Frederick V and Louise of Great Britain | Caroline Matilda of Great Britain; 8 November 1766; Christiansborg Palace two children | 13 March 1808; Rendsburg aged 59 |
| Frederick VI; 13 March 1808 – 3 December 1839 (31 years, 266 days) | | | 28 January 1768; Christiansborg Palace only son of Christian VII and Caroline Matilda of Great Britain | Marie Sophie of Hesse-Kassel; 31 July 1790; Gottorp Castle eight children | 3 December 1839; Amalienborg Palace aged 71 |
| Christian VIII; Christian Frederick; 3 December 1839 – 20 January 1848 (8 years, 49 days) | | | 18 September 1786; Christiansborg Palace grandson of Frederick V and Juliana Maria of Brunswick-Wolfenbüttel | (1) Charlotte Frederica of Mecklenburg-Schwerin; 21 June 1806; Ludwigslust Castle two sons (2) Caroline Amalie of Schleswig-Holstein-Sonderburg-Augustenburg; 22 May 1815; Augustenborg Palace no issue | 20 January 1848; Amalienborg Palace aged 61 |
| Frederick VII; Frederik Carl Christian; 20 January 1848 – 15 November 1863 (15 years, 300 days) | | | 6 October 1808; Amalienborg Palace second son of Christian VIII and Charlotte Frederica of Mecklenburg-Schwerin | (1) Vilhelmine Marie of Denmark; 1 November 1828; Christiansborg Palace no issue (2) Caroline of Mecklenburg; 10 June 1841; Neustrelitz no issue (3) Louise Rasmussen; 7 August 1850; Frederiksborg Palace no issue | 15 November 1863; Glücksburg Castle aged 55 |

==== Schleswig-Holstein-Sonderburg-Glücksburg branch (1863–present) ====
| Name | Portrait | Arms | Birth | Marriage(s) | Death | Claim | Ref. |
|---|---|---|---|---|---|---|---|
| Christian IX; 15 November 1863 – 29 January 1906 (42 years, 76 days) | | | 8 April 1818; Gottorf Castle fourth son of Friedrich Wilhelm, Duke of Schleswig-Holstein-Sonderburg-Glücksburg and Princess Louise Caroline of Hesse-Kassel | Louise of Hesse-Kassel; 26 May 1842; Amalienborg Palace six children | 29 January 1906; Amalienborg Palace aged 87 | Great-grandson of Frederick V and male-line descendant of Christian III | |
| Frederik VIII; Christian Frederik Vilhelm Carl; 29 January 1906 – 14 May 1912 (6 years, 107 days) | | | 3 June 1843; Yellow Palace eldest son of Christian IX and Louise of Hesse-Kassel | Louise of Sweden; 28 July 1869; Stockholm eight children | 14 May 1912; Jungfernstieg, Hamburg aged 68 | Son of Christian IX | |
| Christian X Christian Carl Frederik Albert Alexander Vilhelm; 14 May 1912 – 20 April 1947 (34 years, 343 days) | | | 26 September 1870; Charlottenlund Palace eldest son of Frederik VIII and Louise of Sweden | Alexandrine of Mecklenburg-Schwerin; 26 April 1898; Cannes two sons | 20 April 1947; Amalienborg Palace aged 76 | Son of Frederik VIII | |
| Frederik IX; Christian Frederik Franz Michael Carl Valdemar Georg; 20 April 1947 – 14 January 1972 (24 years, 269 days) | | | 11 March 1899; Sorgenfri Palace eldest son of Christian X and Alexandrine of Mecklenburg-Schwerin | Ingrid of Sweden; 24 May 1935; Storkyrkan Cathedral, Stockholm three daughters | 14 January 1972; Amalienborg Palace aged 72 | Son of Christian X | |
| Margrethe II; Margrethe Alexandrine Þórhildur Ingrid; 14 January 1972 – 14 January 2024 (abdicated) (52 years, 1 day) | | | 16 April 1940; Amalienborg Palace eldest daughter of Frederik IX and Ingrid of Sweden | Henri de Laborde de Monpezat; 10 June 1967; Holmen Church, Copenhagen two sons | Age 86 years, 161 days | Daughter of Frederik IX | |
| Frederik X Frederik André Henrik Christian; 14 January 2024 – present (2 years, 254 days) | | | 26 May 1968; Amalienborg Palace eldest son of Margrethe II and Henri de Laborde de Monpezat | Mary Donaldson; 14 May 2004; Copenhagen Cathedral, Copenhagen four children | Incumbent; Age 58 years, 121 days | Son of Margrethe II | |

== See also ==
- Family tree of Danish monarchs
- Succession to the Danish throne
- List of Danish royal consorts
- Coronation of the Danish monarch
- Danish Crown Regalia
- Style of the Danish sovereign
- Orders of chivalry of Denmark
- Lists of office-holders
