= Olof the Brash =

Swedish chieftain

- Reign: c. 900
- Predecessor: Helge
- Successor: Gyrd and Gnupa
- Born: 9th century
- Dynasty: House of Olaf
- Religion: Norse paganism

Olof was, according to Adam of Bremen, a Swedish chieftain who conquered Denmark c. 900 and founded the House of Olaf. Evidence for his historicity is only circumstantial, since he belongs to a period of Danish history when very little is known from textual sources.

== Arrival from Sweden ==
Our only source for the reign of Olof is the ecclesiastic chronicle of Adam of Bremen (c. 1075). Adam's information is allegedly drawn from an interview with the Danish king Sweyn Estridson (1047-1076) who "enumerated his forefathers". Towards the end of the 9th century Danish Viking armies suffered a series of major defeats in the Frankish kingdoms and in England. This resulted in a serious loss of manpower. Frankish chronicles are silent about political conditions in Denmark in this period and up to the 930s, which contrasts with the rather regular information in the period 777-873. This possibly implies that no strong royal power existed during these decades. After the death of the Viking rulers Sigfred and Gudfred at the battle of Leuven in 891, Denmark was, according to Adam of Bremen, ruled by a certain Helge. Then the kingdom was attacked by an intruder named Olof, coming from the land of the Swedes. Olof conquered the land and made himself king. No further details of his reign are given, except that he founded the House of Olof which reigned for three generations. He had numerous sons, of whom Gnupa and Gyrd were able to gain the throne after the death of their father. Later on the dynasty ended with Sigtrygg Gnupasson who is mentioned on the two Sigtrygg Runestones (DR2 and DR4) erected by his mother after his death. Sigtrygg was ousted by Hardeknud I who inaugurated the Jelling Dynasty.

== Historical debate ==
Since Gnupa is mentioned in a chronicle as having ruled in 934, Olof's reign probably falls in the early 10th century. Although he is not documented by contemporary sources, his son and grandson, Gnupa and Sigtrygg, are mentioned on rune stones, which speaks for his historicity. The passage in Adam's account is often taken to mean that there was a period of Swedish rule in Denmark or part of Denmark. A number of arguments have been put forward to support this, including the existence of a rune stone in Saedinge on Lolland that mentions Swedes. Archaeologists have also wished to identify a Swedish population element in Hedeby. The placement of the rune stones associated with the dynasty has led to the conclusion that the kings ruled from Hedeby in South Jutland, one of the most important commercial centers in Viking Age Scandinavia. However, these conclusions have been debated by historian Niels Lund. Adam depicts the kings of the Olof Dynasty as ruling Denmark in its entirety and not merely South Jutland.

The epithet Olof the Brash, which is sometimes used, is based on a speculative association of Olof with the legendary Ale (Olo) the Brash who, according to Saxo Grammaticus (c. 1200) was sent by his cousin Hring of Sweden to rule Skåne and later the rest of Denmark.

== See also ==
- Viking Age Denmark
- Sigtrygg Runestones
- List of Danish monarchs

Preceded by Helge	King of Denmark	Succeeded by Gyrd and Gnupa
