= Lauenburg (disambiguation) =

Lauenburg is a city in Schleswig-Holstein, Germany

It may also refer to:

- Lauenburg (district), district in Schleswig-Holstein
- Saxe-Lauenburg, former principality in the Holy Roman Empire and later Germany
- Naturpark Lauenburgische Seen, nature park in Lauenburg District
- Burg Lauenburg, a castle in the eastern Harz Mountains
- Lauenburg in Pommern, the German name of Lębork, Pomeranian Voivodeship, Poland
- Landkreis Lauenburg in Pommern, former Prussian administrative unit
- German weather ship Lauenburg, a German weather ship whose capture by the Allies in World War II provided information about the Enigma code
