= Stecklenburg =

Ruined medieval castle

Coordinates: 51°43′51″N 11°5′16″E

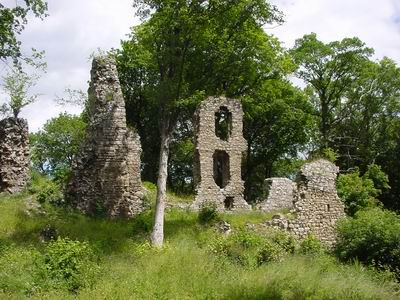
Stecklenburg from the south (2004)

The Stecklenburg is a ruined medieval castle in the East Harz in Germany, located on a small rise only a few hundred metres away from the village of Stecklenberg (in the borough of Thale) in the district of Harz in Saxony-Anhalt.

The castle was built in the 11th century by the Stackelbergs on the remains of an older one. In the 12th century it was destroyed in a battle, but later rebuilt. Its new owners in 1281 were the abbey in Halberstadt.

Stecklenburg was occupied until the beginning of the 18th century. After then, several of the castle buildings, such as the brewery and the castle chapel, were demolished. It fell into total ruin and was used as a quarry. Before it was completely destroyed it was placed under a protection order following an objection by the senior forester of Thale, who then worked on the preservation of the castle.

Today the ruins of Stecklenburg are a protected monument and a popular tourist destination. All that is left of the castle are a few walls from the living quarters and the remains of the keep. The ruins of Lauenburg Castle are located only a few hundred metres away from the Stecklenburg, further up the Ramberg hill.

== Gallery ==
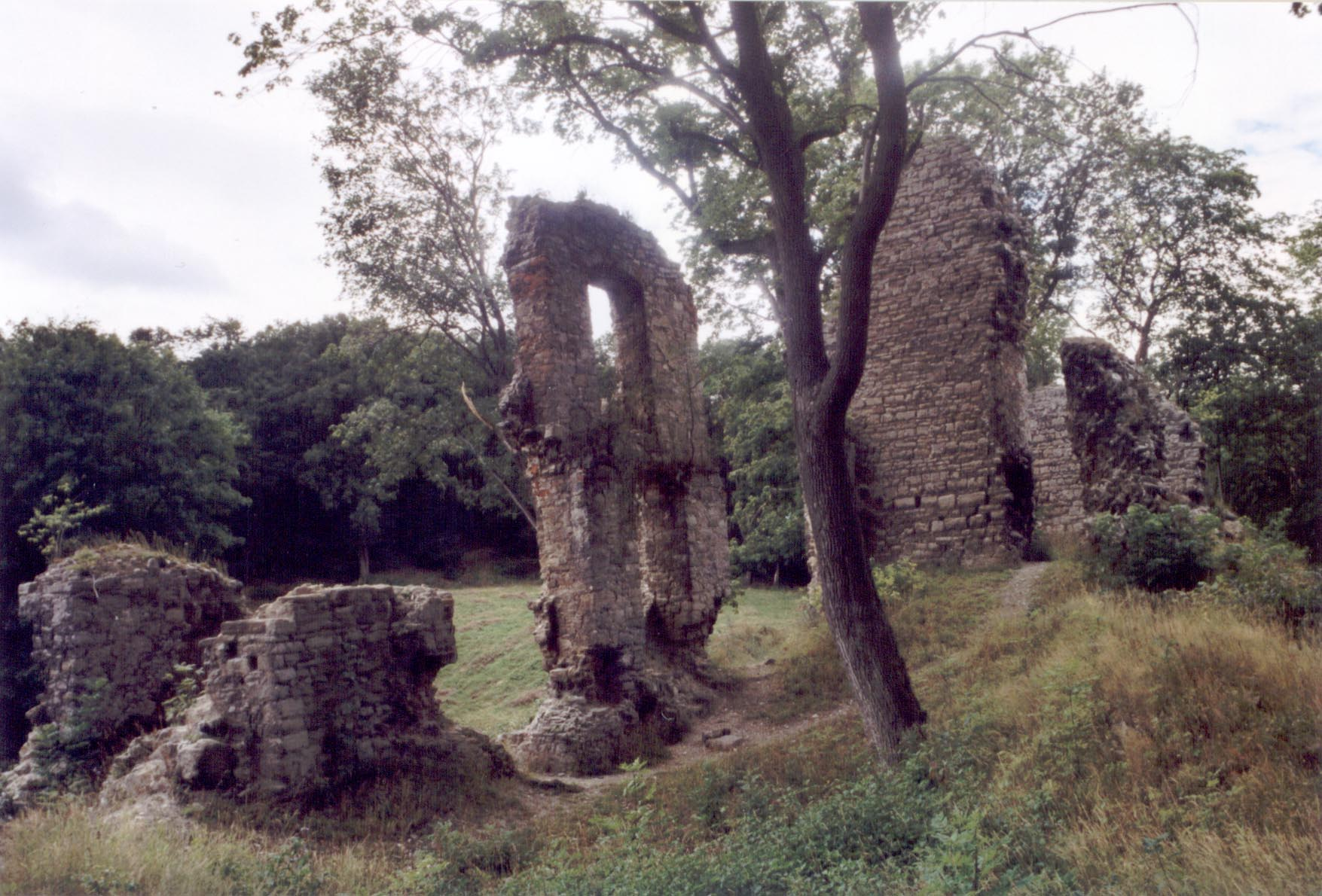
Ruins of the great hall and keep (2005)

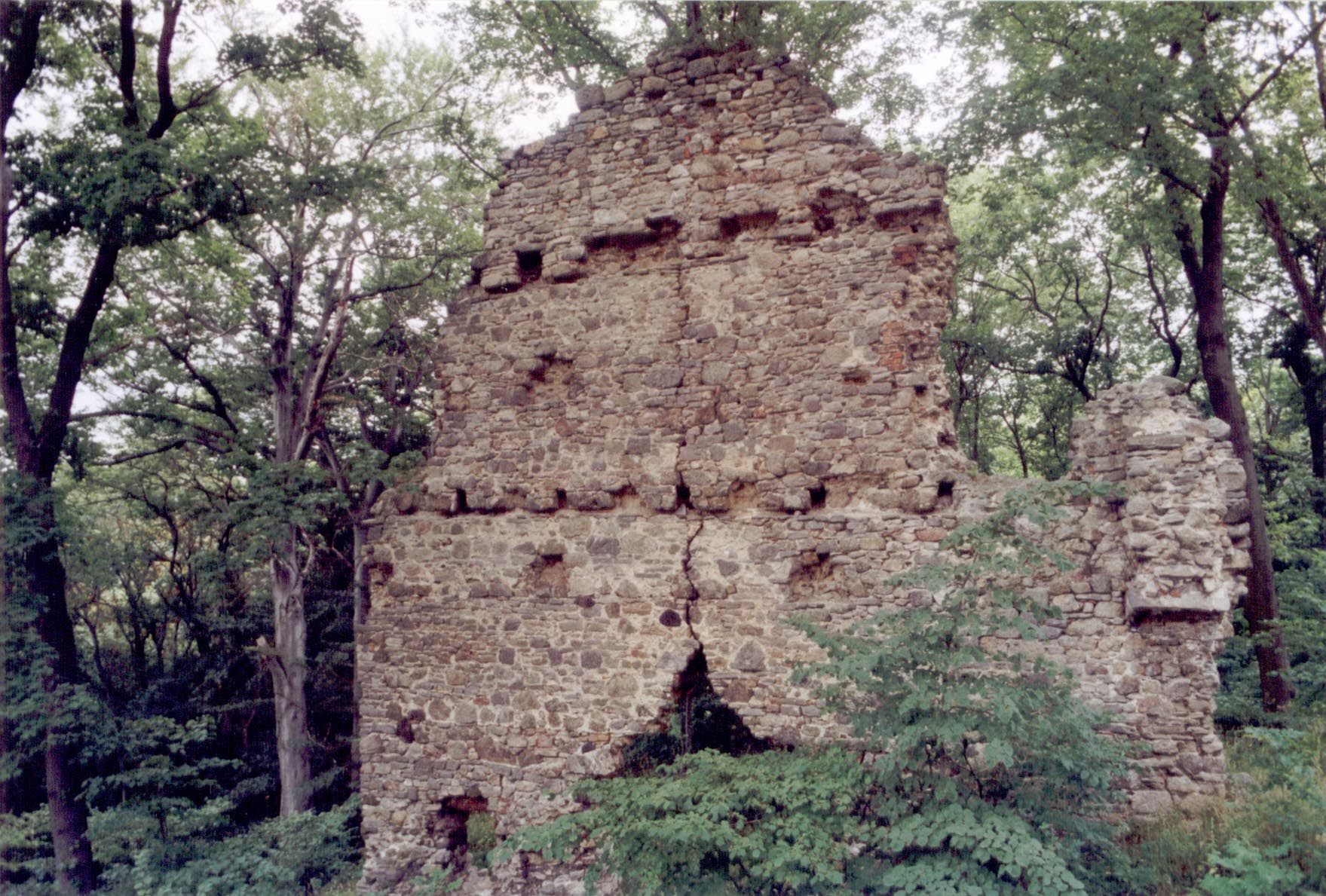
Gable end of a building (2005)

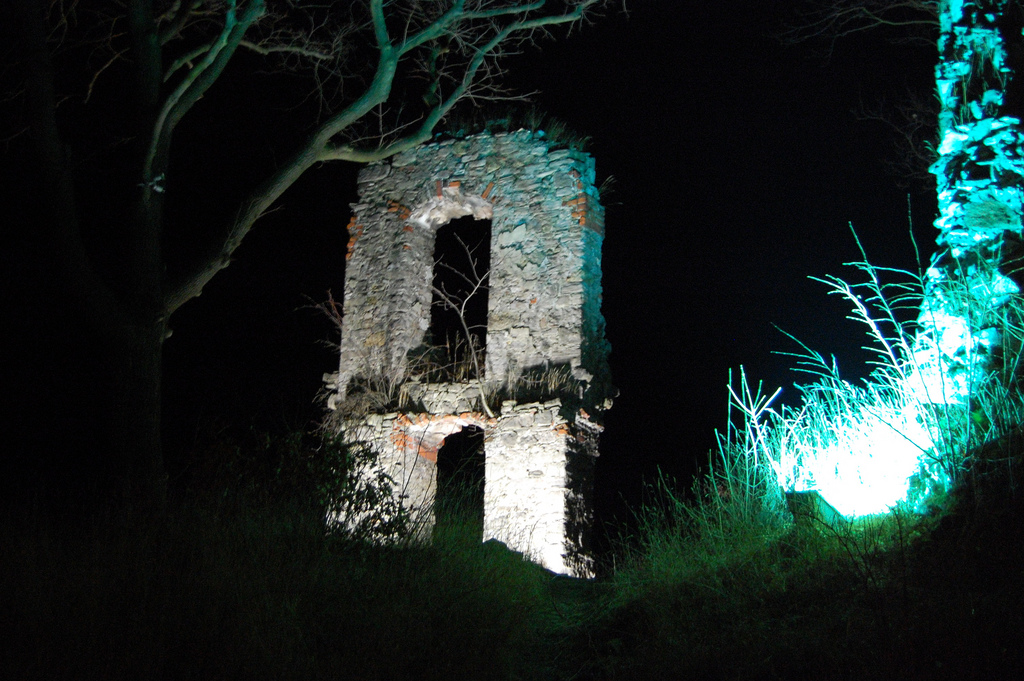
Night view of part of the Stecklenburg (2008)

== See also ==
- Lauenburg Castle
