= Canute I =

Canute I may refer to:

- Canute I of Denmark (born c. 890)
- Canute I of England, the Great (and Cnut II of Denmark) (c. 985 or 995 – 1035)
- Canute I of Sweden (born before 1150 – 1195/96)
