= Sweynsson =

Sweynsson is a Nordic surname. Notable people with the surname include:

- Harthacnut Sweynsson (born c. 880)
- Cnut Sweynsson (c. 985 or 995–1035)
