= Olaf the Swede =

Olaf the Swede may refer to:

- Olof the Brash, Swedish chieftain who conquered Denmark in the late 9th century or early 10th century and founded the House of Olaf
- Olof Skötkonung, son of Eric the Victorious and Sigrid the Haughty
