= Sædinge Runestone =

Viking Age runestone engraved in Old Norse

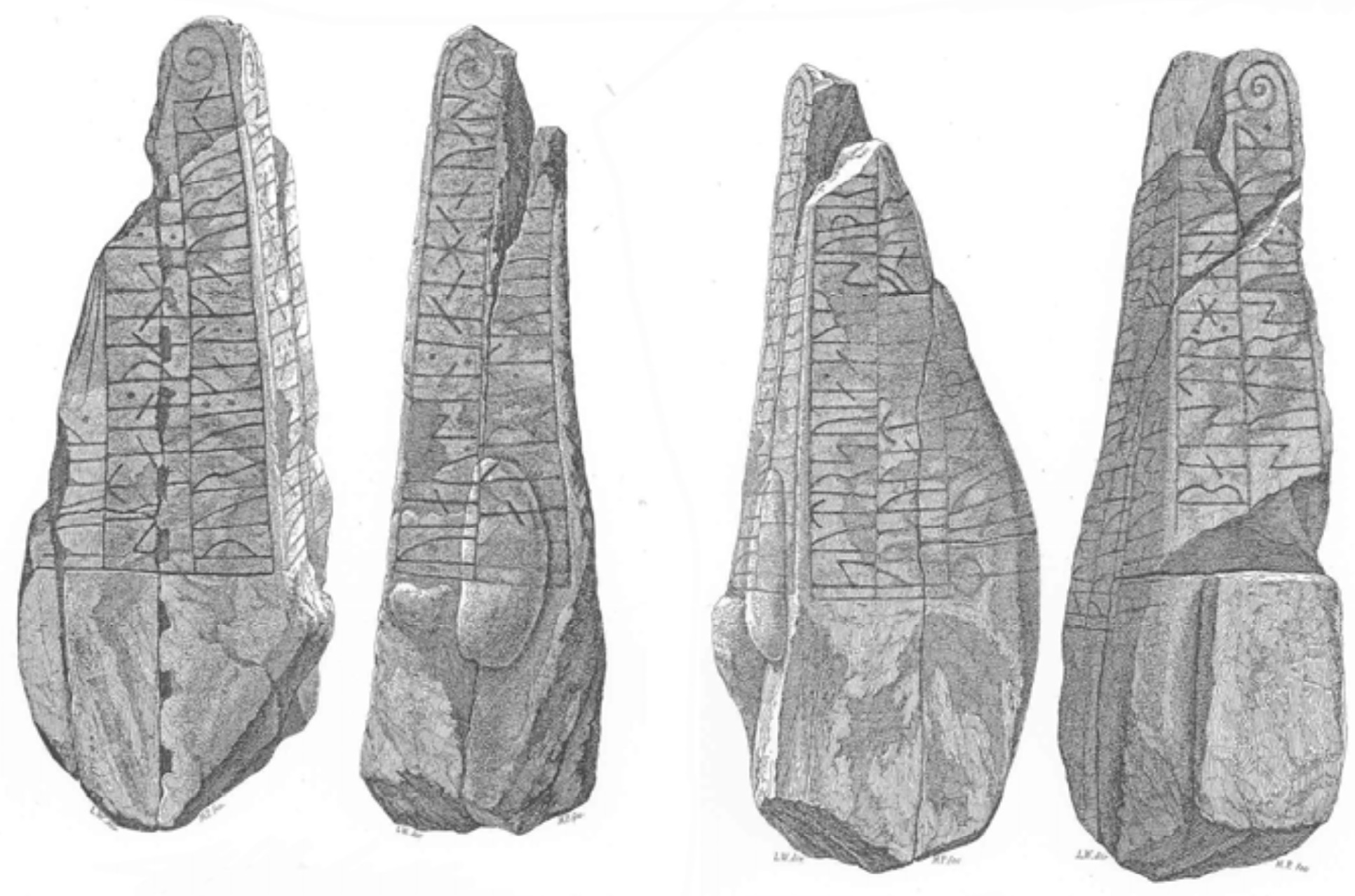
DR 217

The Sædinge Runestone or DR 217 is a Viking Age runestone engraved in Old Norse with the Younger Futhark runic alphabet. It is in granite and measures 174 cm in height, 79 m in width and it is 69 cm thick, and it is dated to the period 970–1020. The style of the runestone is the runestone style RAK. It was discovered in 1854, during the plowing of a field near an old ford. However, it was split in nine pieces and spread around before it was noticed that there were runes on them. It took several searches to find all the pieces. Only the top piece is missing but it is known from an old drawing. The stone is presently located at the Stiftsmuseum in Maribo on Lolland, Denmark. In 2014, it was moved inside the building.

The reading and the interpretation are problematic. The inscription is difficult to read and there are doubts about the message in the inscription and the theory about a Swedish dominion and a Swedish colonization as claimed by Niels Åge Nielsen (1983:132-135) and Erik Moltke (1985:300f.). The interpretation of sutrsuia ("sunder-" or "south Swedes") and suþr[tana] ("south Danes") are contested by e.g. Lerche Nielsen 1993. Based on Kornerup's drawing of the missing top piece, Magnus Källström has read suþr[(m)ana], is suðrmanna (gen. plur.) meaning "south men" as an opposition to ethnonym nurminum, norðmænnum (dat. plur.), i.e. "Norwegians", later in the inscription (Källström 2012). This interpretation is based on the reading of an m-rune, which earlier has not been previously discussed based on the various positions taken by the scholars in the ample literature on this runestone.

== Inscription ==
þurui : kat : kauruan (:) ¶ stain : þansi : --(-) ¶ (k)(r)(u)(k) ·
Þorwi {} gat {} gørwan {} {} sten {} þænsi {} ... {} Krok, {}
"Þyrvé got this stone made ... Krókr,"

uiar (:) sin : ian : han (:) uas ¶ -- alra · triu--...
wær {} sin, {} æn {} han {} was {} [þa](?) allra {} driu[gastr](?)
"her husband, and he was [then](?) the most resolute(?) of all"

sutrsuia (:) au(k) (:) suþr[tana ·] ¶ kuaul : at : ha- af nur¶minum som
sundrswea {} ok {} suþrdana. {} {} Kwol {} at {} ha[l]/ha[nn], af normannum sæm
"Sunder-Swedes and South Danes. Torment ate/ to(?) him/ the hero, the best of Northmen."

baistr : han uas ¶ ... sutrsuia : (-)uk ·
bæztr. {} Han was {} [þa](?) sundrswea {} [l]ok/ok. {}
"He was [there/ then](?) the Sunder-Swedes end / yoke(?)."

== See also ==
- List of runestones
- Sigtrygg Runestones
- Stone of Eric
