= Gorm the Old =

10th-century King of Denmark

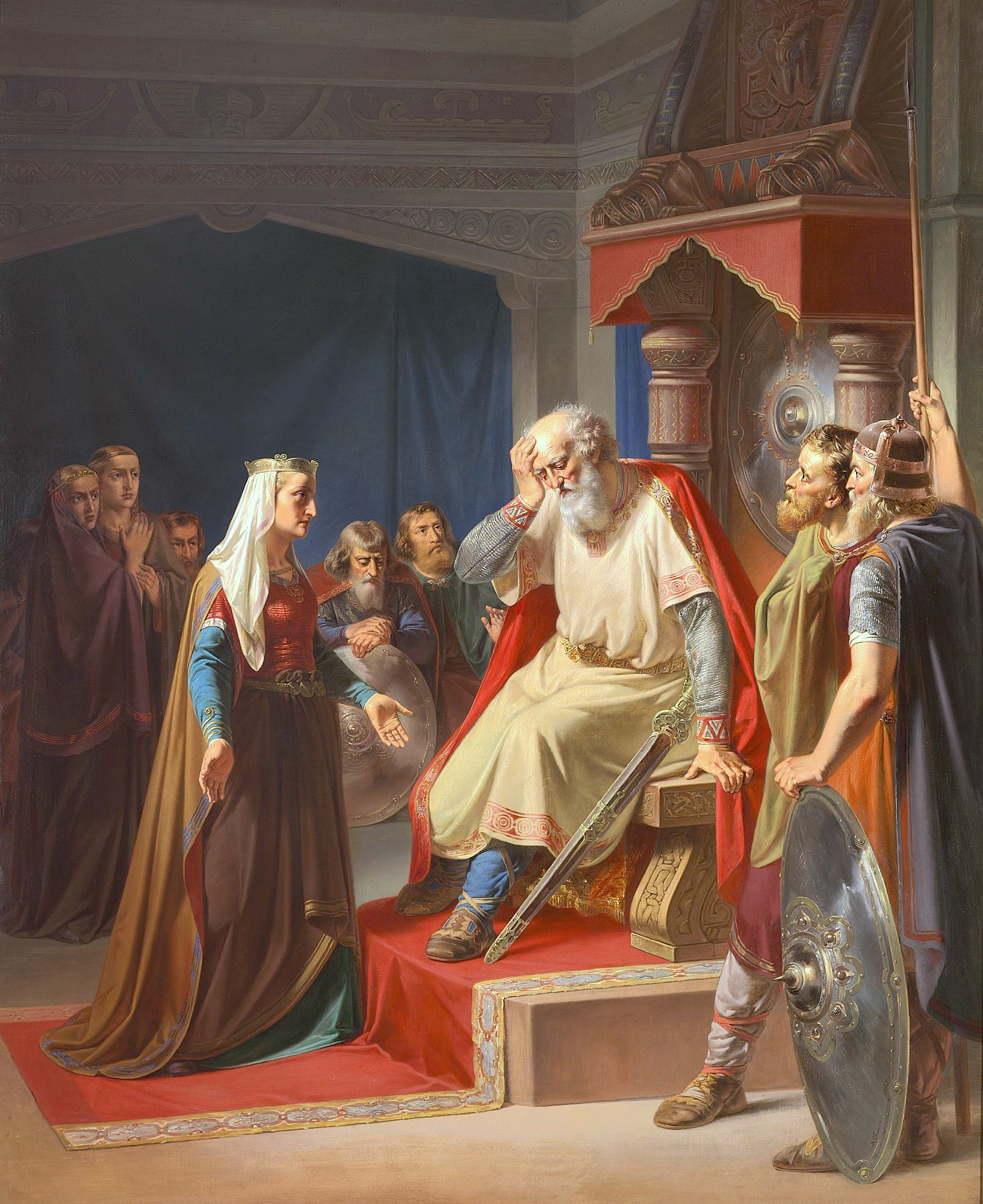
- Gorm learns of the death of his son Canute, 19th century painting by August Carl Vilhelm Thomsen

King of Denmark
- Reign: c. 936 – 958/963/964
- Predecessor: Harthacnut I (Canute I) (semi-legendary) or Gnupa
- Successor: Harald I
- Born: before 900
- Died: 958/963/964
- Spouse: Thyra
- Issue Detail: Harald Bluetooth; Knud Danaást; Gunnhild, Mother of Kings; Strut-Harald; Toke Gormsson
- House: Gorm
- Father: Harthacnut I of Denmark (semi-legendary)
- Mother: unknown
- Religion: Norse paganism

Gorm the Old (Danish: Gorm den Gamle; Old Norse: Gormr gamli; Latin: Gormus Senex), also called Gorm the Languid (Danish: Gorm Løge, Gorm den Dvaske), was ruler of Denmark, reigning from c. 936 to his death c. 958 or a few years later. He ruled from Jelling, and made the oldest of the Jelling stones in honour of his wife Thyra. Gorm was born before 900 and died perhaps around 958 or possibly 963 or 964.

== Origin of name ==
Gorm's name is agreed to be a contraction of a traditional Germanic dithematic name (i.e. a name made by compounding two nouns). The contraction Gormr may have originated as a hypocorism (a nickname) and thus may not have been the most formal form of Gorm's actual name. Suggested origins include Old Norse goð ("god") + ormr ("snake") and goð ("god") + *þormr ("deity").

== Ancestry and reign ==
Gorm is the reported son of semi-legendary Danish king Harthacnut. Chronicler Adam of Bremen says that Harthacnut came from "Northmannia" to Denmark and seized power in the early 10th century. He deposed the young king Sigtrygg Gnupasson, reigning over Western Denmark. When Harthacnut died, Gorm ascended the throne.

Heimskringla reports Gorm taking at least part of the kingdom by force from Gnupa, and Adam himself suggests that the kingdom had been divided prior to Gorm's time. Gorm is first mentioned as the host of Archbishop Unni of Hamburg and Bremen in 936. According to the Jelling Stones, Gorm's son, Harald Bluetooth, "won all of Denmark", so it is speculated that Gorm only ruled Jutland from his seat in Jelling.

== Marriage to Thyra ==
Gorm married Thyra, who is given conflicting and chronologically dubious parentage by late sources, but no contemporary indication of her parentage survives. Gorm raised one of the great burial mounds at Jelling as well as the oldest of the Jelling Stones for her, calling her tanmarkar but ("Denmark's Salvation" or "Denmark's Adornment"). Gorm was the father of three sons, Toke, Knut and Harald, later King Harald Bluetooth.

According to Saxo Grammaticus, Thyra was responsible for the construction of the Dannevirke fortification in the southern part of the Jutland peninsula (today South Schleswig). This tradition gained great national romantic significance for Denmark in the 19th century, where Thyra was seen as the guardian of the southern border.

Danevirke was a wall between Denmark's southern border and its unfriendly Saxons neighbours to the south. The Danevirke ran between the Schlei and the Treene river, across what is now Schleswig.

Excavations that began in 2010 by archaeologists from the Archäologisches Landesamt Schleswig-Holstein and Museum Sønderjylland show however that there were 4–5 phases of the Danevirke rampart. The oldest is from 500 AD or earlier, i.e. over at least 400 years before Thyra's time. Further expansions were on the other hand build at the time of Harald Bluetooth's reign i.e. a long time after Thyra's death. However, Danish historian da:Adam Wagner believes that it is probably a bit too early to completely conclude that Queen Thyra could not have had an influence on the expansion of one or more parts of the Dannevirke.

== Death, burial and reburial ==
One theory is that Gorm the Old died in the winter of 958–959; this is based on dendrochronology that shows that the burial chamber in the northern burial mound in Jelling was made from wood felled in 958. Arild Huitfeldt relates one legend of his death in Danmarks Riges Krønike:

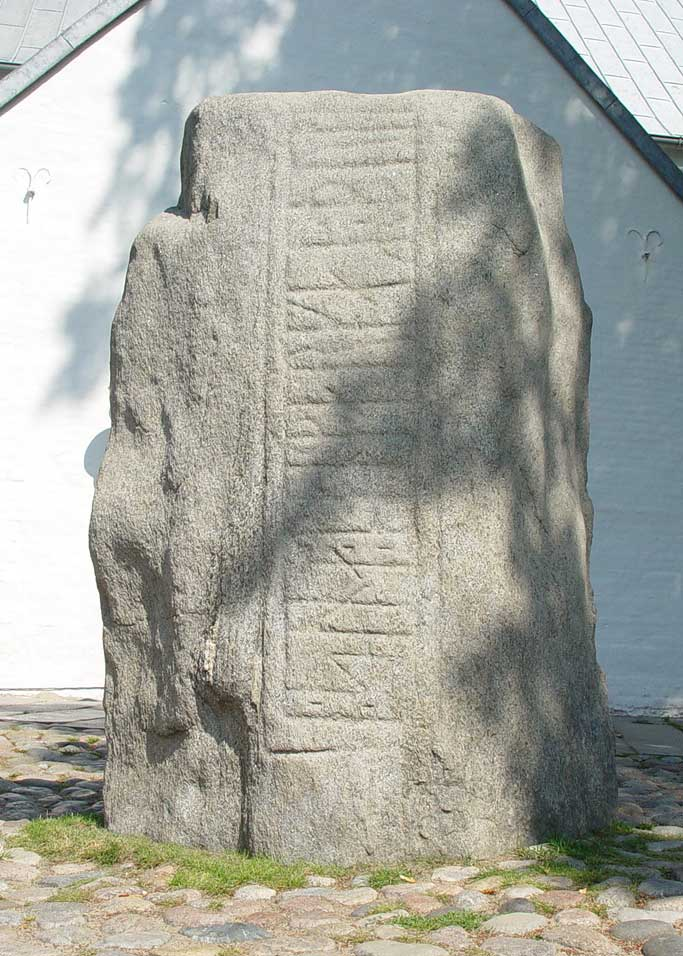
Runic stone for Thyra, front side

The three sons were Vikings in the truest sense, departing Denmark each summer to raid and pillage. Harald came back to the royal enclosure at Jelling with the news that his brother Canute had been killed in an attempt to capture Dublin, Ireland. Canute was shot with a coward's arrow while watching some games at night. No one would tell the king in view of the oath the king had made. Queen Thyra ordered the royal hall hung with black cloth and that no one was to say a single word. When Gorm entered the hall, he was astonished and asked what the mourning colours meant. Queen Thyra spoke up: "Lord King, you had two falcons, one white and the other grey. The white one flew far afield and was set upon by other birds which tore off its beautiful feathers and is now useless to you. Meanwhile, the grey falcon continues to catch fowl for the king's table." Gorm understood immediately the Queen's metaphor and cried out, "My son is surely dead, since all of Denmark mourns!" "You have said it, your majesty," Thyra announced, "Not I, but what you have said is true." According to the story Gorm was so grieved by Canute's death that he died the following day.

This account would contradict information on the Jelling Stones which point to Queen Thyra dying before Gorm. Some archaeologists and historians have suggested that Gorm was buried first in Queen Thyra's grave mound at Jelling, and later moved by his son, Harald Bluetooth, into the original wooden church in Jelling. According to this theory it is believed that the skeleton found at the site of the first Christian church of Jelling is in fact Gorm the Old, though the theory is still much debated. During the reign of Gorm, most Danes still worshipped the Norse gods, but during the reign of Gorm's son, Harald Bluetooth, Denmark officially converted to Christianity. Harald, accordingly, left the hill where Gorm had originally been interred as a memorial.

== Legacy ==
Gorm was "old" in the sense that he was considered the traditional ancestral "head" of the Danish monarchy. Saxo Grammaticus in the Gesta Danorum asserts that Gorm was older than other monarchs and, having lived so long, was blind by the time his son Canute was killed.

== See also ==
- Gorm's Cup

Regnal titles
Preceded by Harthacnut I	King of Denmark c. 936 – 958/964	Succeeded by Harald Bluetooth
