= Harthacnut I of Denmark =

Semi-legendary king of Denmark

Harthacnut I
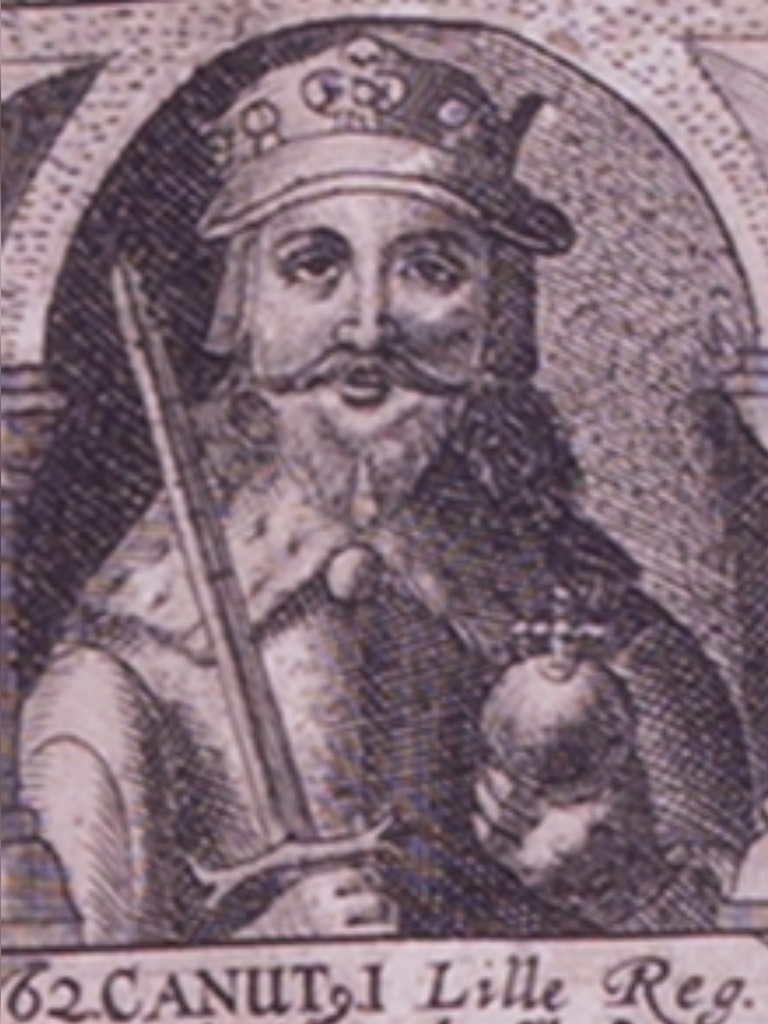
- 1670 depiction of Harthacanut I

Legendary kings of Denmark
- Reign: early 10th century
- Predecessor: Sigtrygg Gnupasson (?)
- Successor: Gorm the Old
- House: Gorm
- Religion: Norse paganism

Harthacnut I or Cnut I (Danish: Hardeknud; Old Norse: Hǫrða-Knútr) was a semi-legendary King of Denmark. The old Norse story Ragnarssona þáttr makes Harthacnut son of the semi-mythic viking chieftain Sigurd Snake-in-the-Eye, himself one of the sons of the legendary Ragnar Lodbrok. The saga in turn makes Harthacnut the father of the historical king, Gorm. It has been suggested he is to be identified with the Hardegon of Northmannia whose early-10th century conquest of Denmark was related by Adam of Bremen.

== Ragnarssona þáttr ==
The saga Ragnarssona þáttr relates the acts of the sons of Ragnar Lodbrok, and proceeds to link them genealogically to the later rulers of the Scandinavian kingdoms. For Denmark, it relates that by Blaeja, the daughter of King Ælla of Northumbria, Sigurd Snake-in-the-Eye became father of Harthacnut (Hörða-Knútr). Harthacnut is said to have been his father's successor in Zealand, Scania and Halland, but not the break-away Viken, and he was father of Gorm. Scholarly opinion is divided as to the degree to which the material found in such heroic sources is to be taken as authentic history and genealogy.

== Gesta Hammaburgensis ecclesiae pontificum of Adam of Bremen ==
Two possible references to Harthacnut appear in the work of clergyman Adam of Bremen, who came from Germany to record the history of the Archbishops of Bremen (Gesta Hammaburgensis ecclesiae pontificum), partly based on information from Gorm's descendant, Sweyn II of Denmark. Adam states that a king Helge was deposed and Denmark was conquered by Olof the Brash who came from Sweden (Sueonia). Along with two of his sons, Gyrd and Gnupa, Olof took the realm "by force of arms," and they ruled it together, thus founding the House of Olaf in Denmark. Adam reports that they were followed by a Sigtrygg. That Sigtrygg was the son of Gnupa by a Danish noblewoman named Asfrid, and is shown on two runestones near Schleswig, erected by his mother after his death.

Adam then relates that after Sigtrygg reigned a short time, during the tenure of Archbishop Hoger of Bremen (909–915/917), Hardegon, son of Sweyn, came from "Northmannia" the "land of the Northmen," by which he may have meant Norway, Northumbria, Normandy, which had recently been colonized by Danish Vikings, or even northern Jutland. Hardegon immediately deposed the young king Sigtrygg, and then ruled unopposed for approximately thirty years. Hardegon is often equated with the Harthacnut of legend, but some historians, such as Lis Jacobsen, instead have concluded that Hardegon is distinct.

Adam later refers to an attack on Denmark by Henry I of Germany, naming the defending king as Hardecnudth Vurm in some manuscripts, filius Hardecnudth Vurm in others. Historians generally agree that Vurm (English: worm or serpent) is a German rendering of the Danish name Gorm, and this leads to alternative interpretations, that this is reference to Gorm, son (filius) of Harthacnut, or that it is a double-name indicating that Harthacnut and Gorm were the same person. The Saxon chronicles of Widukind of Corvey report the defeat and forced baptism of the Danish king Chnuba (Gnupa), in 934 at the hands of Henry I. Likewise, Olav Tryggvasson's Saga tells of Gnupa's defeat by Gorm the Old. Some historians (e.g. Storm) have taken these as indications that Sigtrygg's father Gnupa still ruled at least part of Denmark much later than credited by Adam of Bremen, and his dynasty was only displaced by Harthacnut's son, Gorm.

== Gesta Danorum of Saxo Grammaticus ==
In the late and legend-influenced Gesta Danorum of Saxo Grammaticus, Harthacnut appears as Knut. He is described as a son of Erik, a descendant of Ragnar Lodbrok, by Gudorm, the granddaughter of Harald Klak. In his version of the tale, Harthacnut is raised by Ennignup (suggested to be Saxo's rendition of Gnupa), but never accepts Christianity.

== Chronicon Roskildense ==
The anonymous 12th-century Chronicon Roskildense contains what appears to be a confused rendering that appears to combine aspects of Adam of Bremen's account of the conquest of Denmark by Hardegon, son of Sweyn from Norway, with the later Danish conquest of England by Sweyn Forkbeard. It reports that king Sven went from Norway to England, where he expelled king Ethelred, and that his sons Harthacnut and Gorm conquered Denmark, killing king Haraldus. Denmark was then taken by Gorm and England by Harthacnut.

== Silverdale treasure ==
In the Silverdale Hoard is a silver coin impressed with the name "Airdeconut" an Anglicized or Romanized variant of Harthacnut. The hoard dates to the early 10th century, but the style is similar to coins of other viking kings of Northumbria. The coin of Airdeconut could relate to an otherwise unknown Northumbrian viking king, or it could relate to an already known Harthacnut such as the Harthacnut of Denmark. It's thus not inconceivable that the same person could have ruled in both Northumbria and in Denmark, perhaps not at the same time? However, some have suggested that the Northmannia from which Adam's Danish conqueror Hardegon came may be Northumbria, or that it may be Normandy, with which one recent linguistic analysis would connect the spelling of the name Airdeconut.

== Notes ==
Regnal titles
Preceded by Uncertain (perhaps Sigtrygg Gnupasson (as suggested in one source))	King of Denmark early 10th century (perhaps only part of kingdom)	Succeeded by Gorm the Old
