= Lauenburg Castle =

Ruined castle in Germany

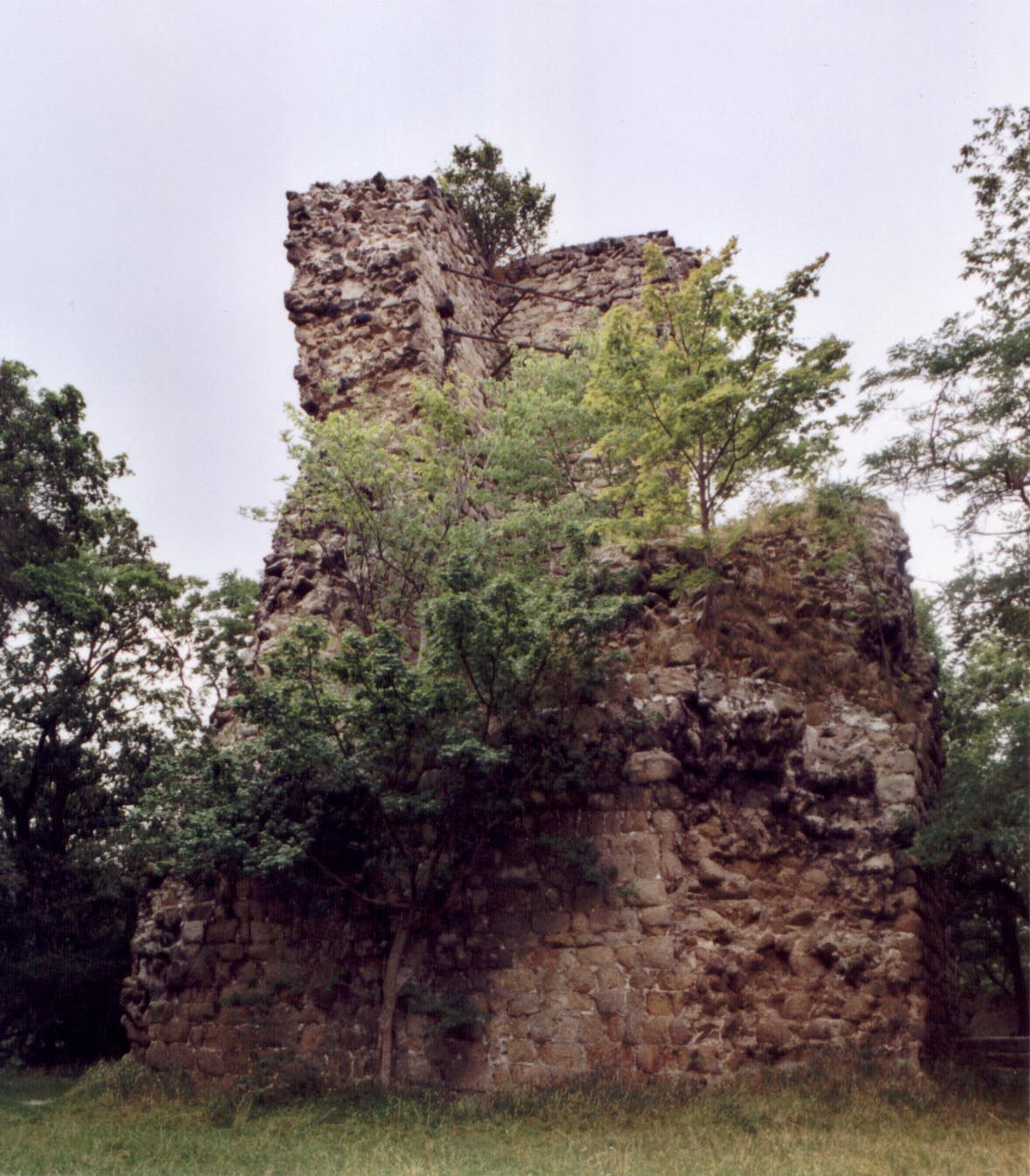
- Little Lauenburg, east side of the keep

- Location within Germany

General information
- Classification: ruins
- Location: Stecklenberg
- Coordinates: 51°43′37.4″N 11°4′52″E
- Completed: 1164

The Lauenburg is a ruined medieval castle in the East Harz in central Germany situated on an elevation southwest of the village of Stecklenberg (in the borough of Thale) in Harz district in the state of Saxony-Anhalt in the former German Democratic Republic (East Germany).

The castle was built in the High Middle Ages.

The ruins of the Lauenburg stand on a foothill of the Ramberg massif above the village of Stecklenberg. It was built by Henry IV and first mentioned in the records in 1164. The construction of the two-part castle with its inner and outer wards (Vorburg and Hauptburg) probably took up to ten years. The two halves of the castle are separated by a massive defensive ditch (a neck ditch or Halsgraben), hewn out of the rock. The purpose of this impressive fortification with a total length of more than 350 metres was the protection of Quedlinburg and the nearby military roads. In 1180 the Lauenburg was captured by Frederick I (Barbarossa) during a series of warlike conflicts. Later robber barons resided in the castle for periods of time, until it was destroyed in the 14th century.

Today the main castle is badly run-down. Only a few remnants of the towers and the outer walls are still left. The only structure in the entire fortification that has withstood the ravages of time and history relatively well is the keep of the outer ward. Its ruins can be seen from a long way off.

The Lauenburg has a checkpoint (no. 187) in the network of hiking trails that form the Harzer Wandernadel. It is on the path by the entrance to the inn that is situated between the two parts of the castle.

== Access ==
The castle may accessed on a footpath that runs from behind the church in Stecklenberg; there is a small car park in front of the church. The path climbs steeply past a children's play park up to the ruined castle of Stecklenburg. Beyond the ruins, the path continues uphill to the Lauenburg.

== Gallery ==
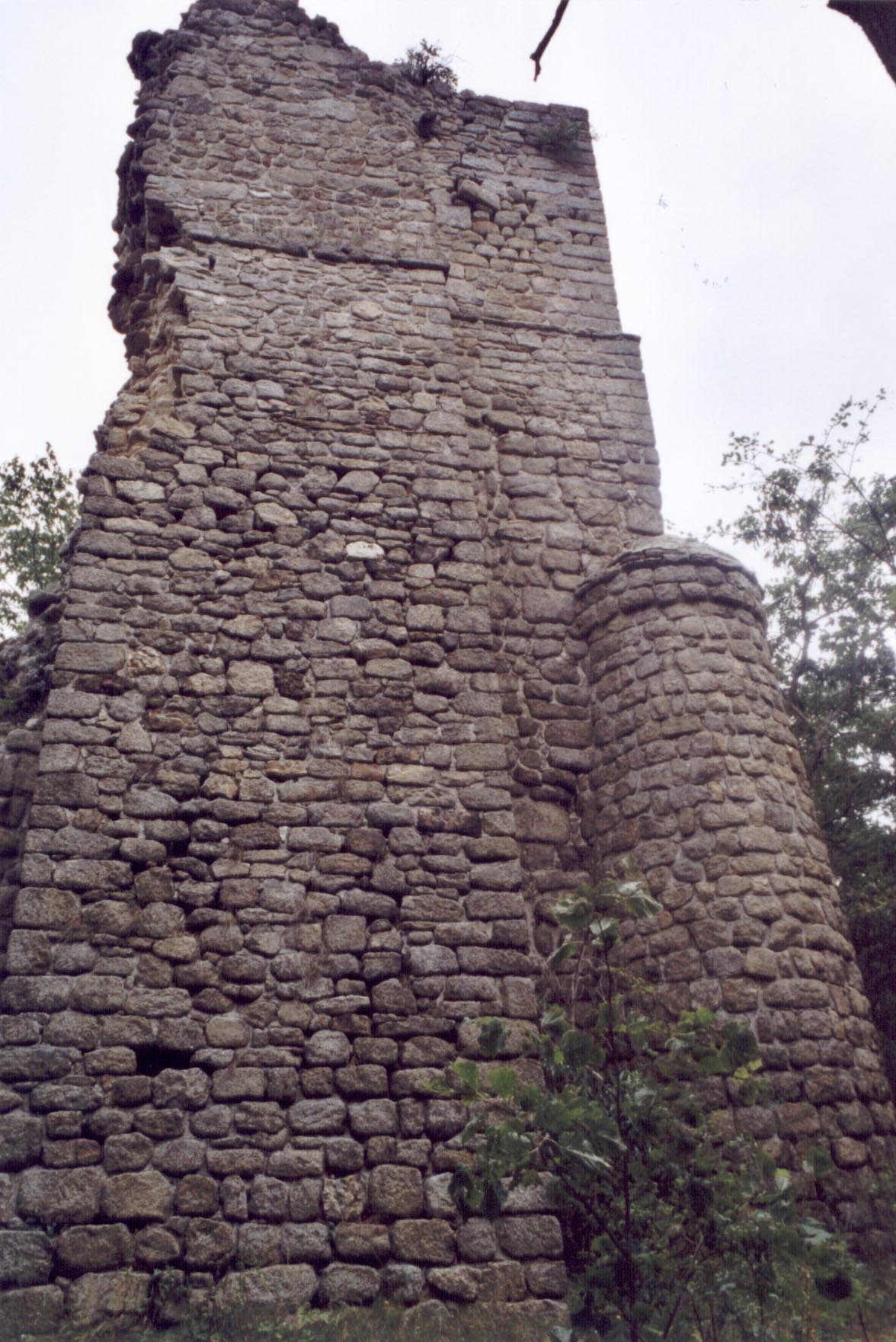
Little (Kleine) Lauenburg, west side of the keep (2005)

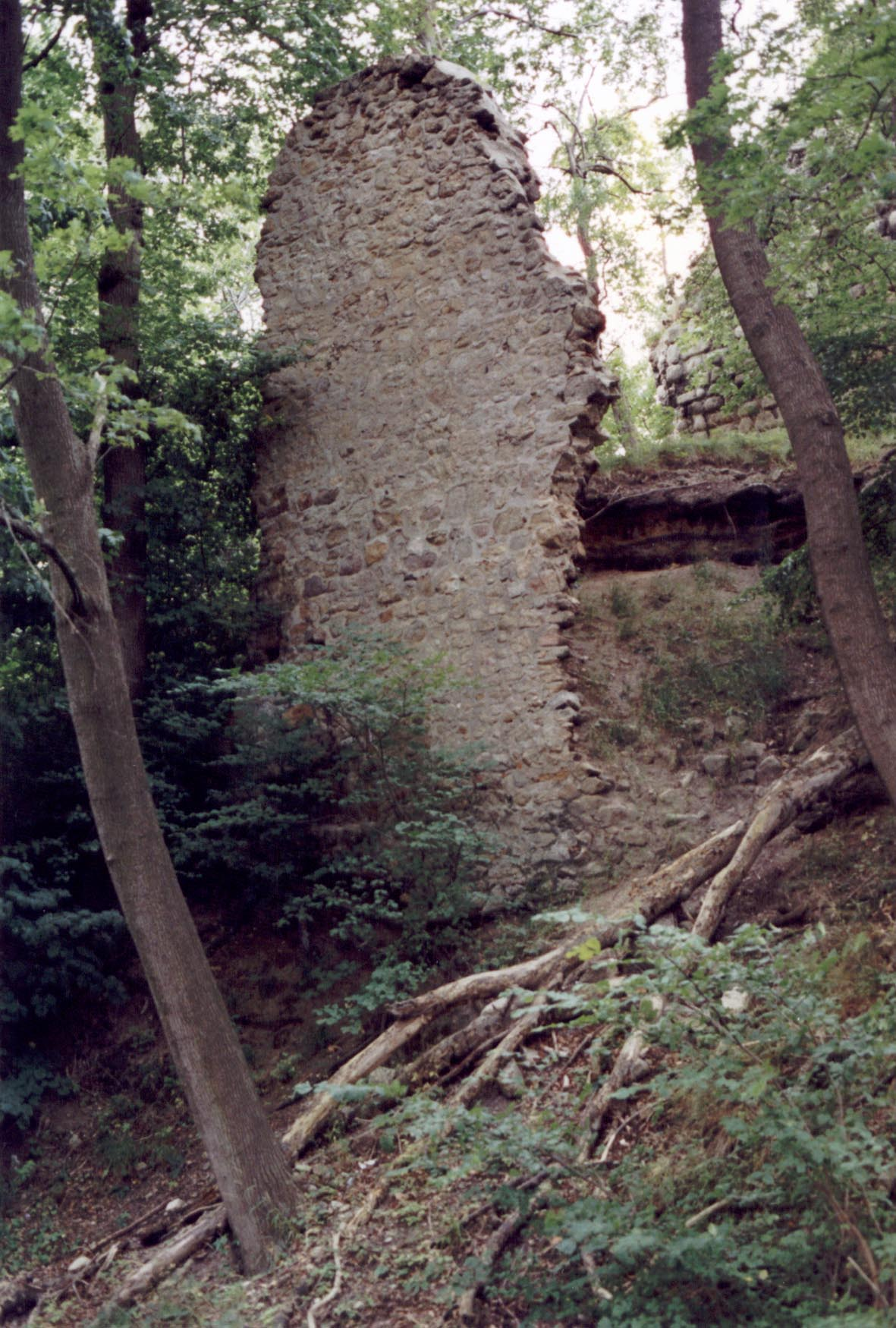
Little Lauenburg, remains of the Bering or of a building on the north side (2005)
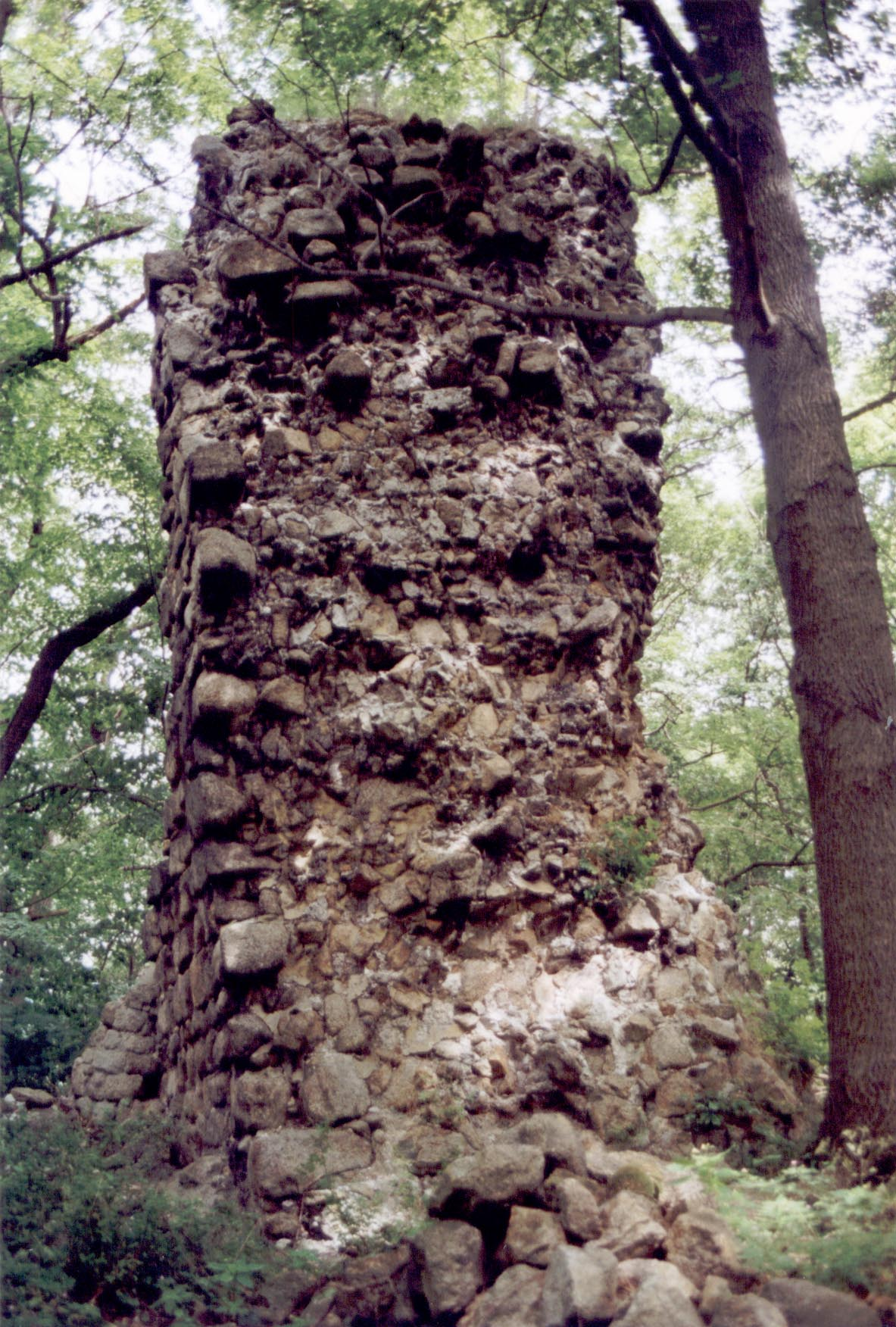
Great (Große) Lauenburg: keep in the area of the eastern bailey (2005)

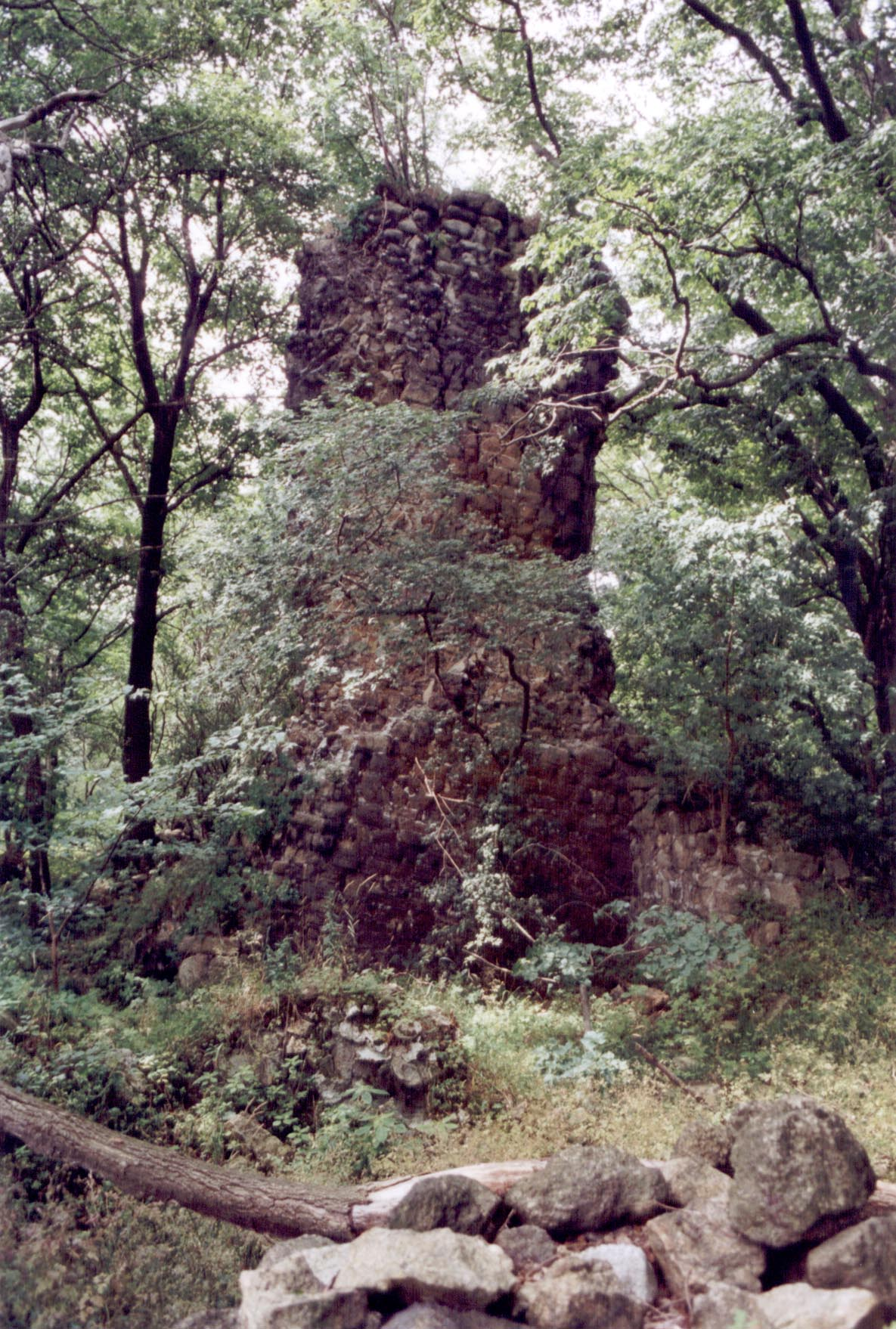
Great Lauenburg, keep in the area of the eastern bailey (2005)

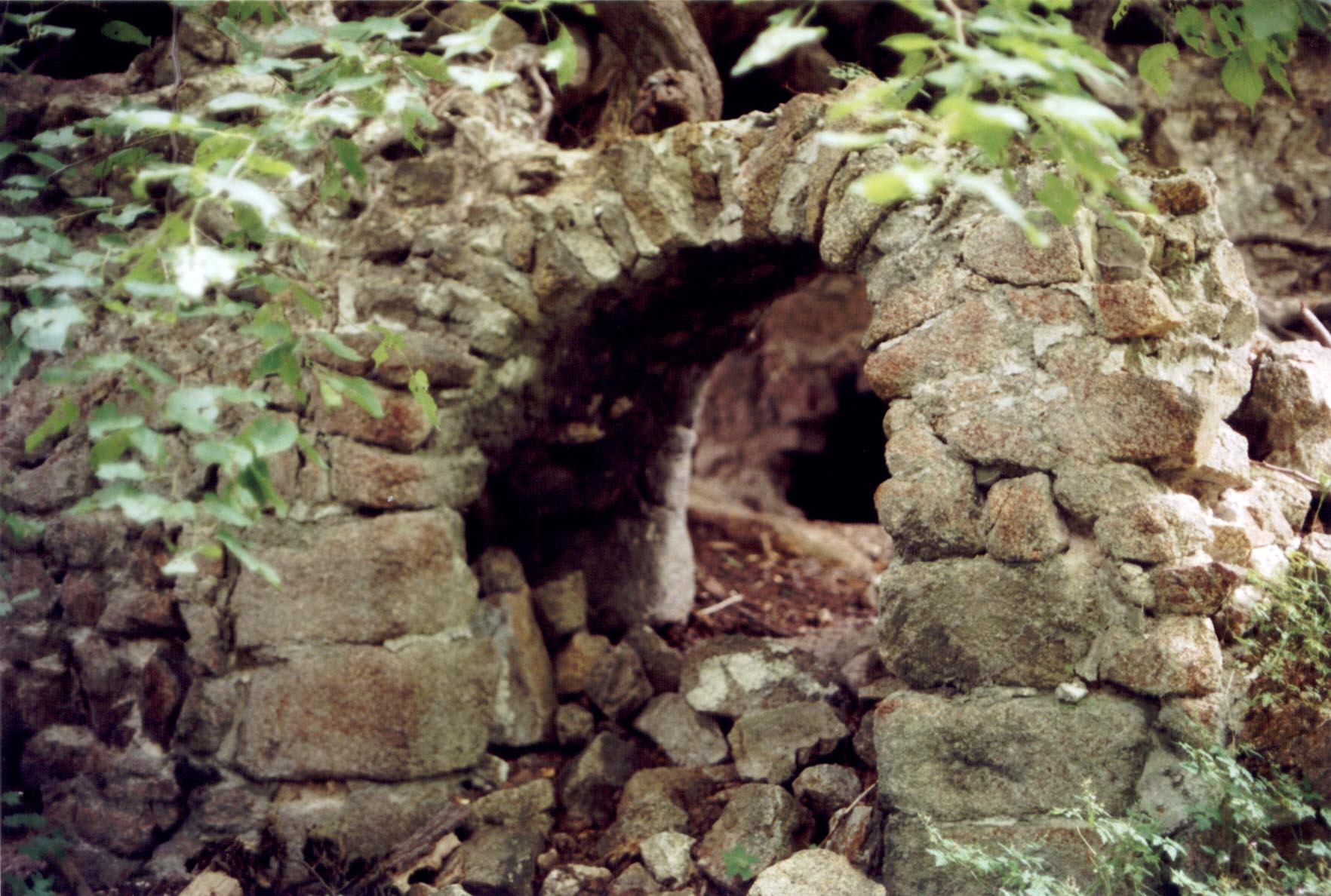
Great Lauenburg, arch in the area of the gate (2005)

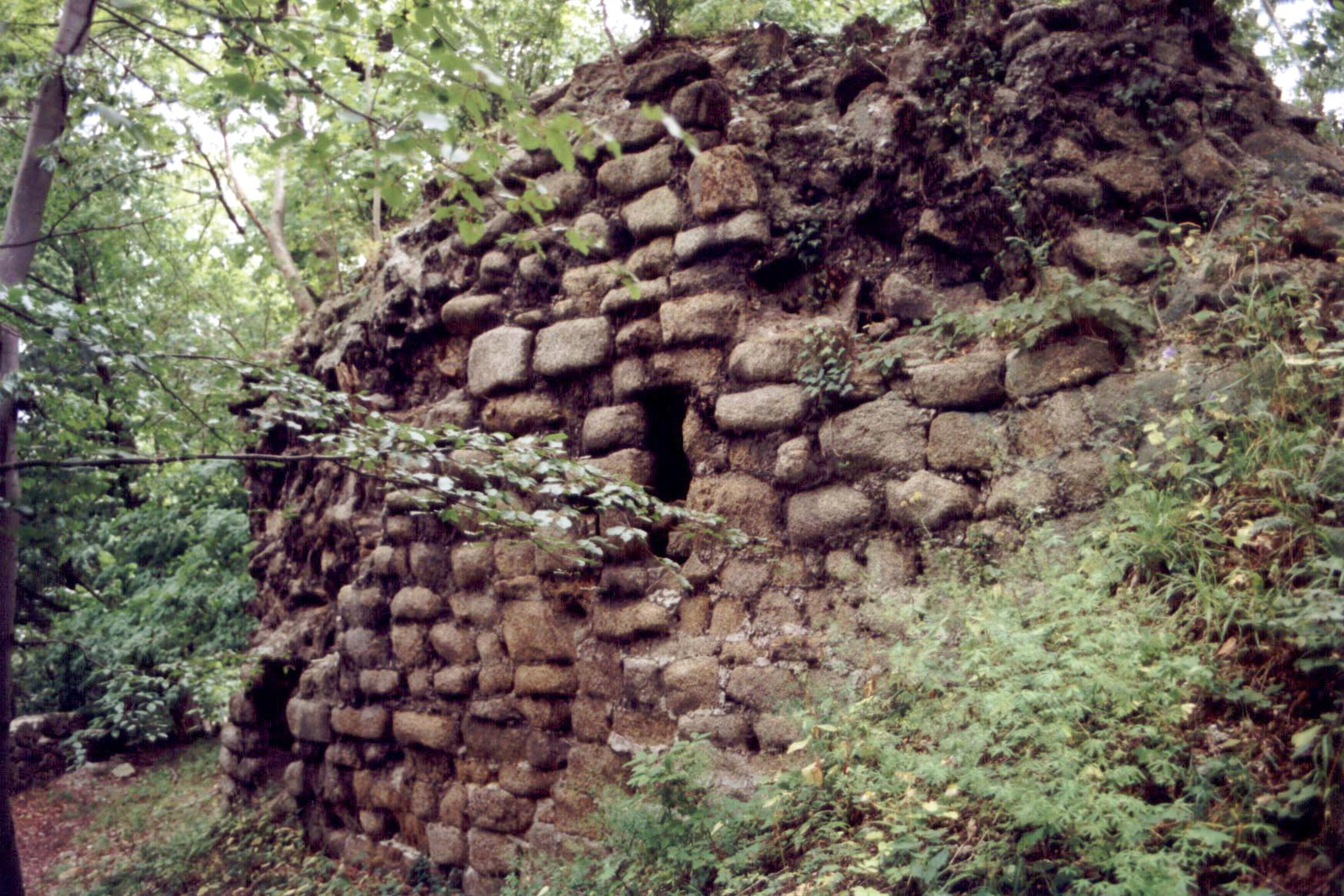
Great Lauenburg, building ruins in the area of the western Kernburg (2005)
