= Sigtrygg Gnupasson =

King of Denmark
- Reign: 900's (perhaps early 930's)
- Predecessor: Gyrd and Gnupa
- Successor: Harthacnut I ?
- Born: 9th or 10th century
- Died: before 934
- Dynasty: House of Olaf
- Father: Gnupa
- Mother: Asfrid
- Religion: Norse paganism

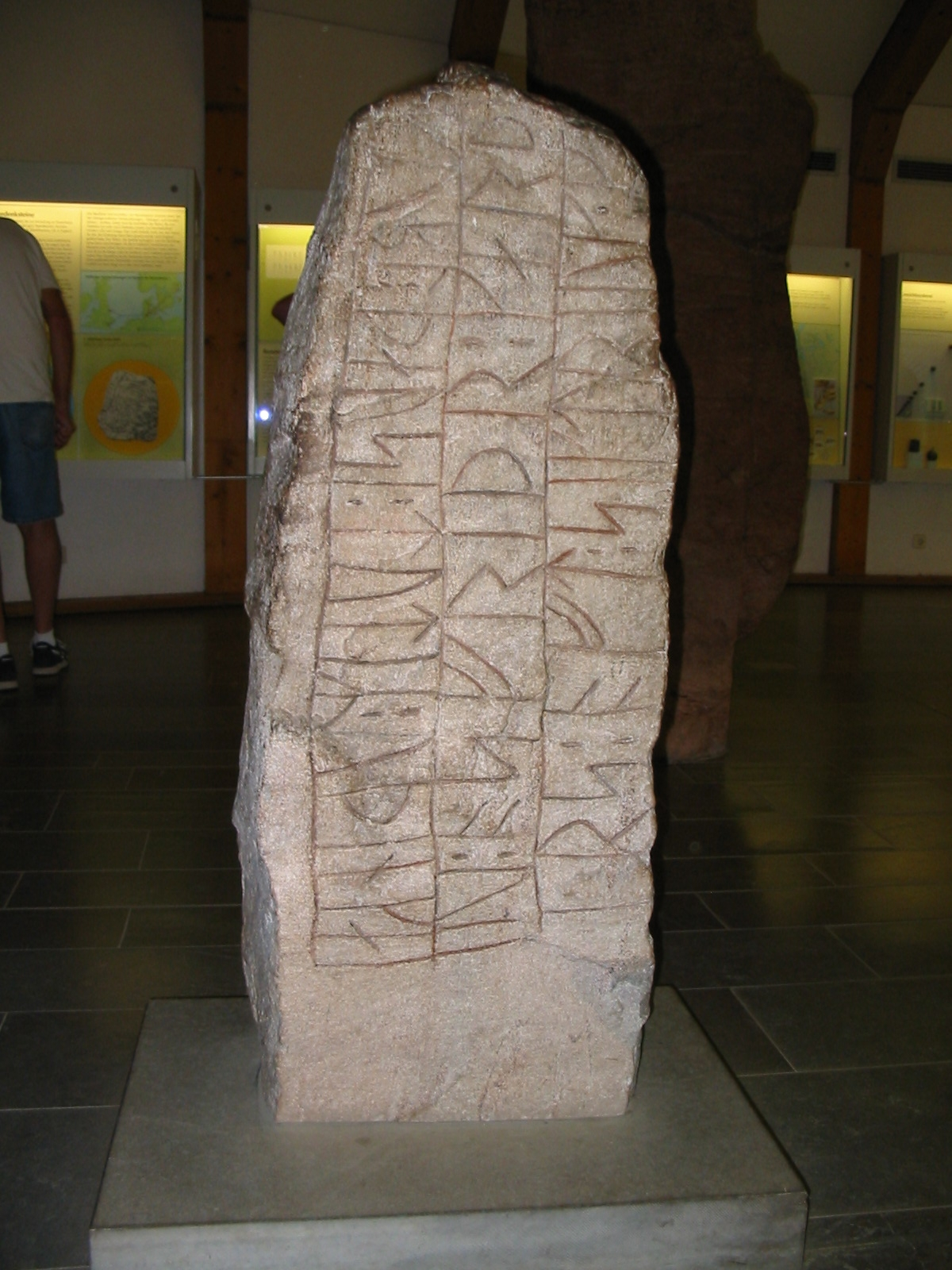
The runestone DR 4 raised after Sigtrygg by his mother.

Sigtrygg Gnupasson was a semi-legendary king of Denmark of the House of Olaf who ruled in the 10th century, according to Adam of Bremen.

Sigtrygg was son of Gnupa and the Danish noblewoman Asfrid. According to Adam, he became a Danish king during the tenure of Archbishop Hoger of Bremen (909–915/7). He is remembered on the two Sigtrygg Runestones found near Schleswig, (DR2 and DR4), erected by his mother after his death, suggesting this area represented the power-base of the family.

Based on the testimony of king Sweyn, Adam reports that prior to Hoger's death, Harthacnut came to Denmark and immediately deposed the young king Sigtrygg. However other sources show a Chnuba (usually identified with Gnupa, Sigtrygg's father) still ruling in 934, while Heimskringla reports Gnupa's defeat by Gorm the Old, again placing his death later than Adam would have it. The lost Gesta Wulinensis ecclesiae pontificum, of which the authenticity is highly disputed, states that Gnupa outlived his son Sigtrygg. Adam himself mentions the existence of other kings at this time and expresses doubt that Denmark represented a single united realm.

Regnal titles
Preceded by Gyrd and Gnupa	King of Denmark	Succeeded by Harthacnut I
