= Gyrd and Gnupa =

Kings of Denmark
- Reign: early 900's
- Predecessor: Olaf the Brash
- Successor: Sigtrygg Gnupasson
- Born: 9th century
- Dynasty: House of Olaf
- Father: Olof the Brash
- Religion: Norse paganism

Gyrd and Gnupa were kings of Denmark in the 10th century according to Sweyn II of Denmark and Adam of Bremen. They were the sons of the Swedish chieftain Olof (or Olaf) the Brash who had conquered Denmark and they ruled together according to Swedish tradition.

Gnupa is mentioned on the two Sigtrygg Runestones raised near Schleswig by his wife Asfrid for their son Sigtrygg. Likewise a Danish king Chnuba is named by Widukind of Corvey's Saxon chronicles as having been defeated and forced to accept baptism in 934, and Olav Tryggvasson's Saga tells of Gnupa's defeat by Gorm the Old. However, this chronology would contradict that of Adam of Bremen, who places the succession and subsequent defeat of Sigtrygg during the tenure of Archbishop Hoger of Bremen (909–915/7). The late and legend-influenced Gesta Danorum of Saxo Grammaticus names a nobleman Ennignup serving as guardian for a young king Knut at some time prior to king Gorm the Old and it has been suggested he may be a confused representation of Gnupa.

Regnal titles
Preceded by Olof the Brash	King of Denmark	Succeeded by Sigtrygg Gnupasson
