= House of Olaf =

Noble family

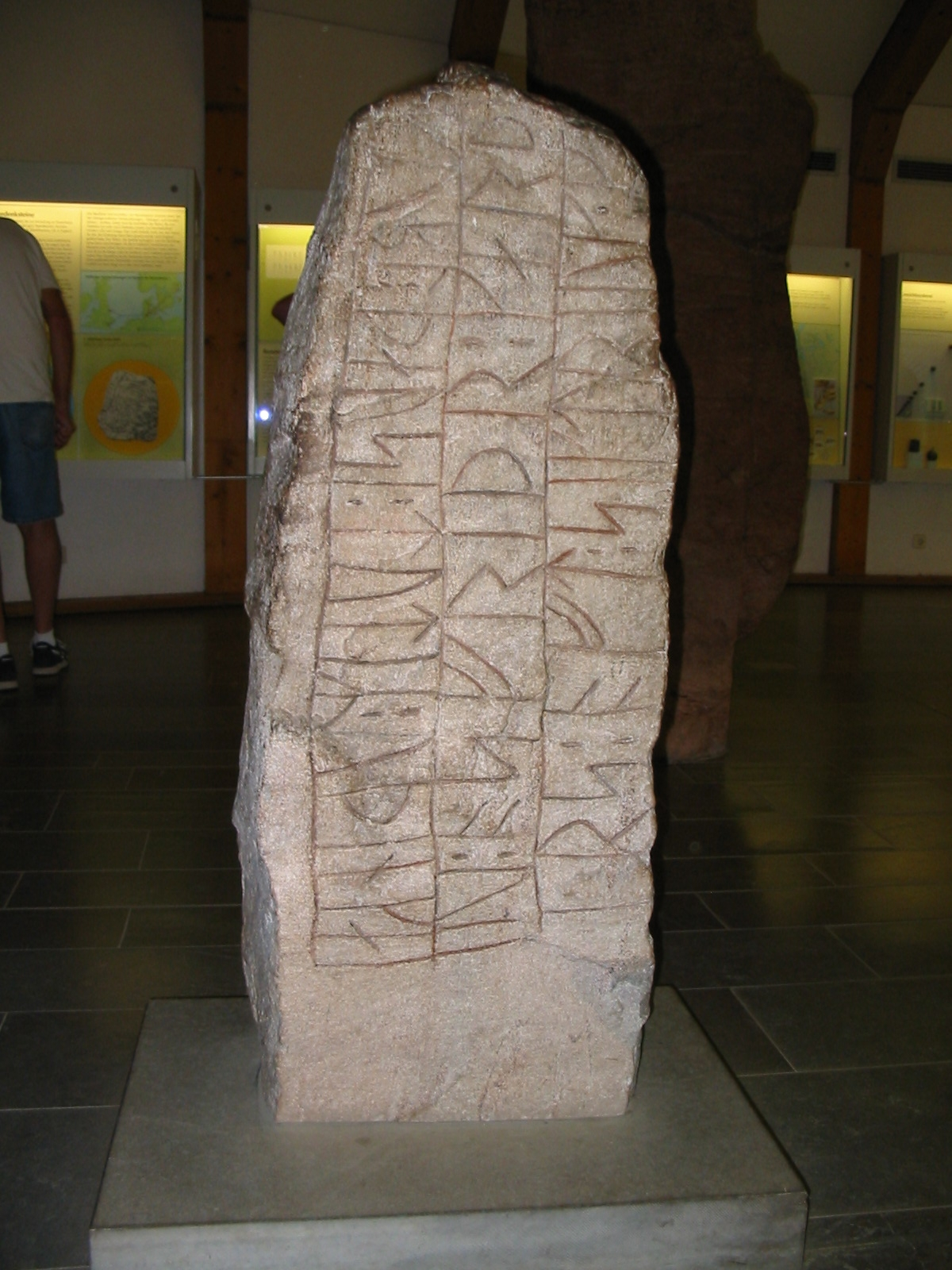
The Small Sigtrygg runestone raised for Sigtrygg by his mother

The House of Olaf was a dynasty of Swedish origin which ruled Denmark or part of Denmark in the late 9th century and early 10th century

- Olof the Brash
- Gyrd and Gnupa (sons of Olof)
- Sigtrygg Gnupasson (son of Gnupa and Asfrid, Odinkar's daughter)

The existence of Gnupa and Sigtrygg is confirmed by the two Sigtrygg Runestones.
