= Stecklenberg =

- Stadtteil of Thale
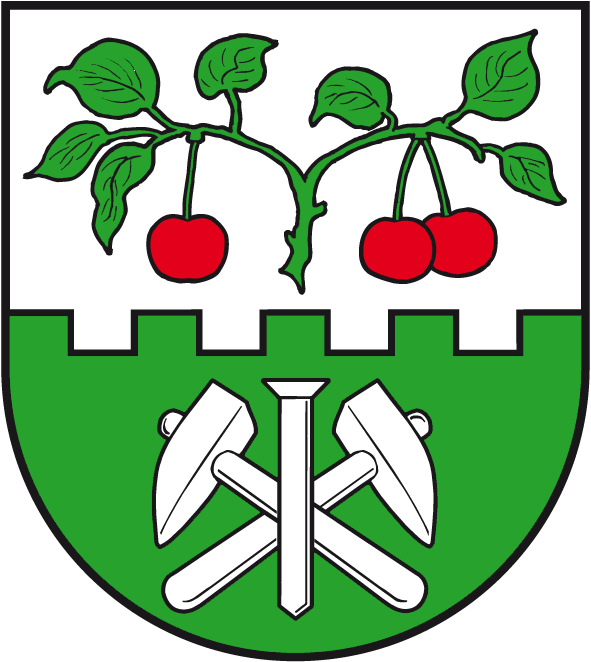
- Coat of arms
- Interactive map of Stecklenberg
- Location within Germany Location within Saxony-Anhalt
- Coordinates: 51°44′N 11°5′E
- Country: Germany
- State: Saxony-Anhalt
- District: Harz
- Town: Thale

Area
  - Total: 5.98 km^{2} (2.31 sq mi)
- Elevation: 265 m (869 ft)

Population (2006-12-31)
  - Total: 663
  - Density: 111/km^{2} (287/sq mi)
- Time zone: UTC+01:00 (CET)
  - Summer (DST): UTC+02:00 (CEST)
- Postal codes: 06507
- Dialling codes: 03947
- Vehicle registration: HZ

Stecklenberg (German pronunciation: [ˈʃtɛklənbɛʁk]) is a village and a former municipality in the district of Harz, in Saxony-Anhalt, Germany. Since 23 November 2009, it is part of the town Thale.

== Sights ==
The Glockenstein is a granite block in the shape of a bell that was probably used in prehistoric times as an Old Germanic cult site. Today it is checkpoint 73 on the Harzer Wandernadel hiking network.
