= Varangian runestones =

Runestones in Scandinavia that mention voyages to the East

Clickable map of the geographic distribution of the Varangian Runestones in southern Scandinavia (modern administrative borders and cities are shown)

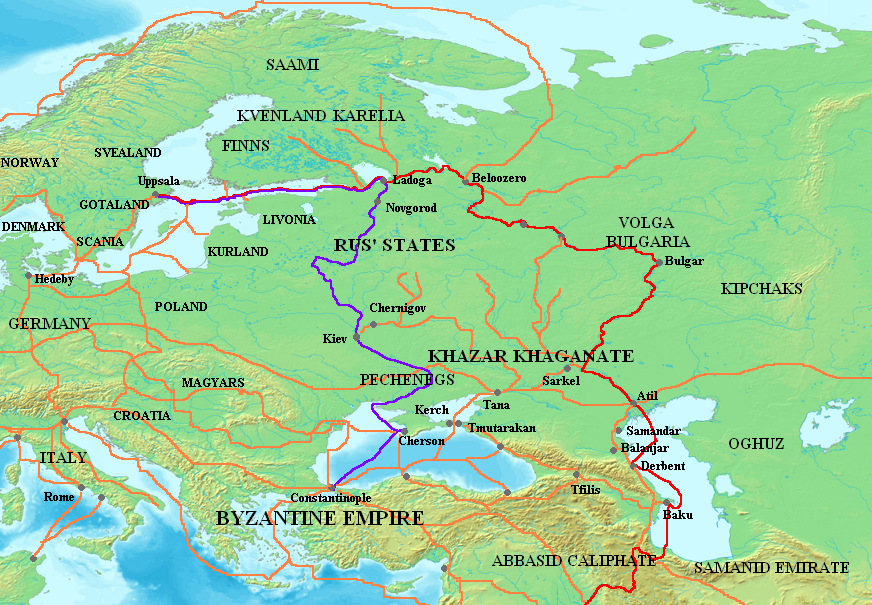
A map of the main routes east from Scandinavia.

The Varangian Runestones are runestones in Scandinavia, primarily in Sweden, that mention voyages to the East (Old Norse: Austr) or the Eastern route (Old Norse: Austrvegr), or to more specific eastern locations such as Garðaríki in Eastern Europe.

There are also many additional runestones in Scandinavia that talk of eastward voyages such as the Greece Runestones, Italy Runestones, and inscriptions left by the Varangian Guard. Other runestones that deal with Varangian expeditions include the Serkland Runestones (dealing with expeditions to the Middle East) and the Ingvar Runestones (erected in honor or memory of those who travelled to the Caspian Sea with Ingvar the Far-Travelled). There is also a separate article for the Baltic expeditions runestones. In addition, there were also voyages to Western Europe mentioned on runestones that are treated in the articles Viking Runestones, England Runestones and Hakon Jarl Runestones.

Most of the runestones were raised during the Christianization of the 11th century when the making of runestones was fashionable, but notably, the Kälvesten Runestone Ög 8 was made in the 9th century when the Varangians played a central role in what would become Russia and Ukraine. This vast area was a rich source of pelts, hides and people, and it was an important component in the contemporary Swedish economy. Its Old Norse name meant 'land of fortresses' and was derived from the chains of fortresses that had been constructed along the trade routes.

All of the stones were engraved in Old Norse with the Younger Futhark and the message of many of the inscriptions can be summarized with a poem in the fornyrðislag style found on the Turinge Runestone Sö 338:

Brøðr vaʀu
þæiʀ bæzstra manna,
a landi
ok i liði uti,
heldu sina
huskarla ve[l].
Hann fioll i orrustu
austr i Garðum,
liðs forungi,
landmanna bæzstr.

Translation:

These brothers were
the best of men
in the land
and abroad in the retinue,
held their housecarls well.

He fell in battle
in the east in Garðar (Russia),
commander of the retinue,
the best of landholders.

Below follows a presentation of the runestones based on the Rundata project. The transcriptions into Old Norse are mostly in the Swedish and Danish dialect to facilitate comparison with the inscriptions, while the English translation provided by Rundata gives the names in the de facto standard dialect (the Icelandic and Norwegian dialect):

== Sweden ==
=== Uppland ===
==== U 153 ====
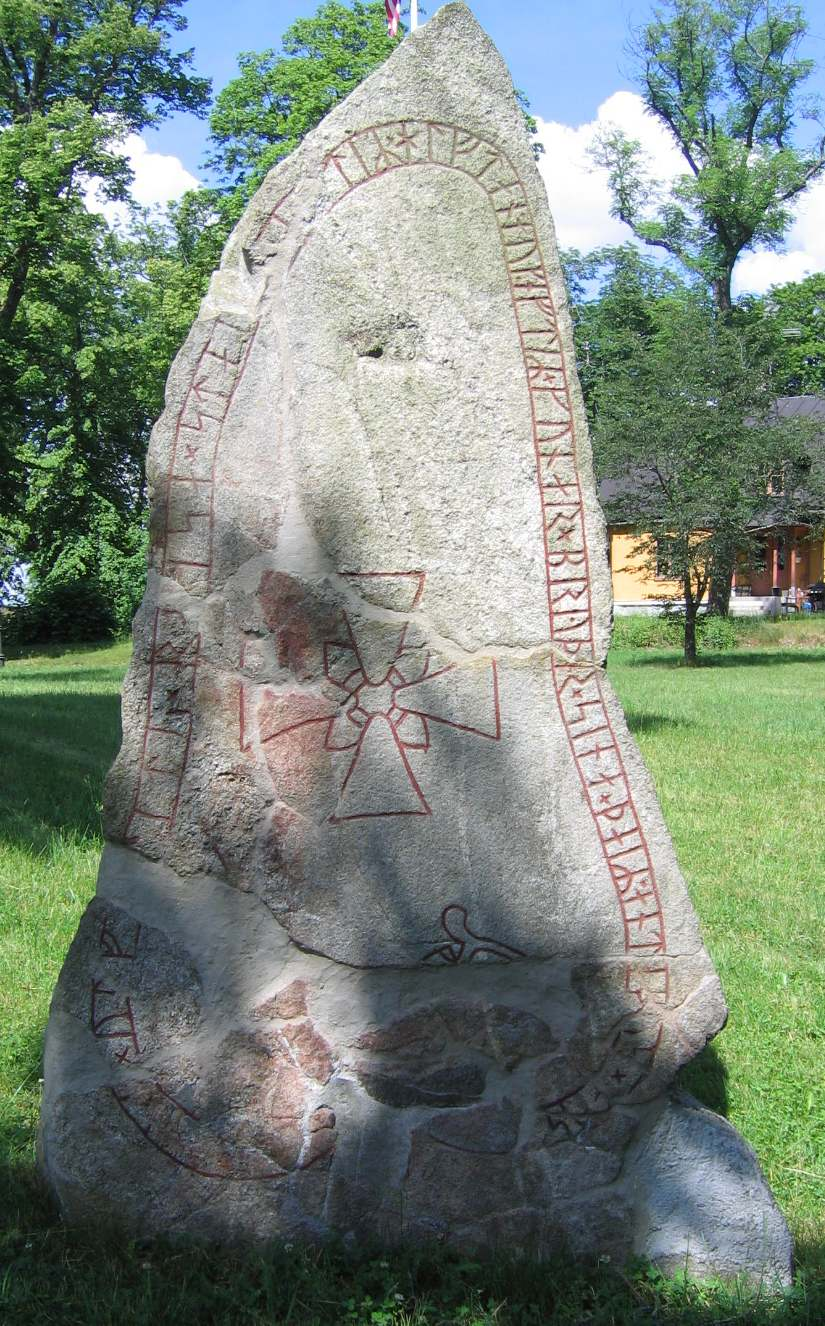
Runestone U 153

This runestone in style Pr3 is one of the runestones in Hagby. It was discovered in 1930 in the basement under the main building of the old estate Lissby which had been demolished in the late 19th century. It had been inserted in the basement wall with the engraved side visible together with the runestones U 152 and U 154. When the basement collapsed, the runestone was splintered into a great number of minor and major pieces of which the top part was the largest one. A fragment of the stone was discovered in the field on the property of Lissby. All in all, no less than 70 pieces were reassembled, and in 1931, the repaired stone was raised in the garden of Hagby. The stone is in granite and it is 2.60 m tall and 1.5 m wide. The inscription is damaged and especially in its beginning and end. It refers to several stones and one of them was probably the runestone U 155.

The last runes may be reconstructed as either [i karþ]um ('in Garðar', (Note: Garðar was the original name for the lands of Rus', particularly of Novgorodian Rus', in runic inscriptions, poetry of skalds and sagas. The name was then superseded by Garðaríki, which first appeared in Icelandic sagas in the twelfth century.) i.e. 'in the lands of Rus'') or [i krik]um ('among Greeks', i.e. 'in the Byzantine Empire').

The inscription reads:

...[(u)](a)i- × [(a)]uk × ulf- litu × raisa × stai-(a) × e(f)tiʀ × hlftan · auk · eftiʀ × kunar × bryþr × sina × þaiʀ · antaþus × aust... ...(u)m
[S]væi[nn] {} ok {} Ulf[ʀ] letu {} ræisa {} stæi[n]a {} æftiʀ {} Halfdan {} ok {} æftiʀ {} Gunnar, {} brøðr {} sina. {} Þæiʀ {} ændaðus {} aust[r] ...
Sveinn and Ulfr had the stones raised in memory of Halfdan and in memory of Gunnarr, their brothers. They met their end in the east ...

==== U 154 ====
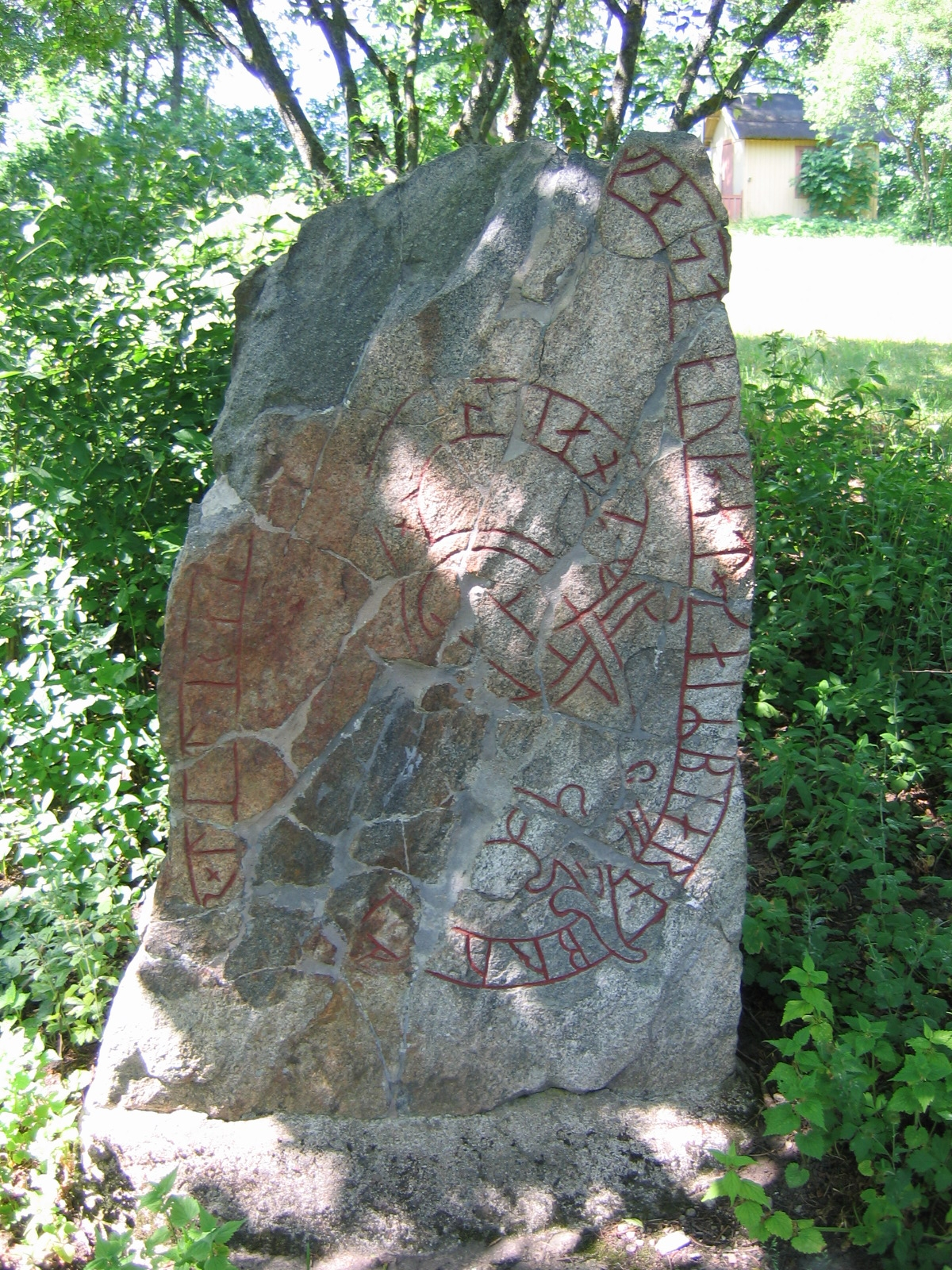
Runestone U 154

This runestone in style Pr3 and it is one of the runestones in Hagby. It was discovered together with U 151 and U 153 in a collapsed basement under the eastern part of the foundation of the main building of the farm Lissby. When it was discovered, it was still standing but it had been crushed and it crumbled into 50 pieces when it was removed from the wall. It was reassembled but the upper part had been lost and could not be retrieved. In 1931, it was raised in the garden of Hagby. The stone is dark and it is 1.23 m tall and 0.3 m wide. The inscription is damaged in several places.

The inscription reads:

[þ(o)]...r × lit × rai... ... ...fast · auk × at × (k)aiʀbiarn × bruþ- ... ...i(ʀ) · (t)o a(u)s... ×
... {} let {} ræi[sa] ... ...fast {} ok {} at {} Gæiʀbiorn, {} brøð[r] ... [þæ]iʀ {} dou aus[tr]. {}
... had raised ... ...-fastr and in memory of Geirbjǫrn, (their) brothers ... They died in the east.

==== U 209 ====
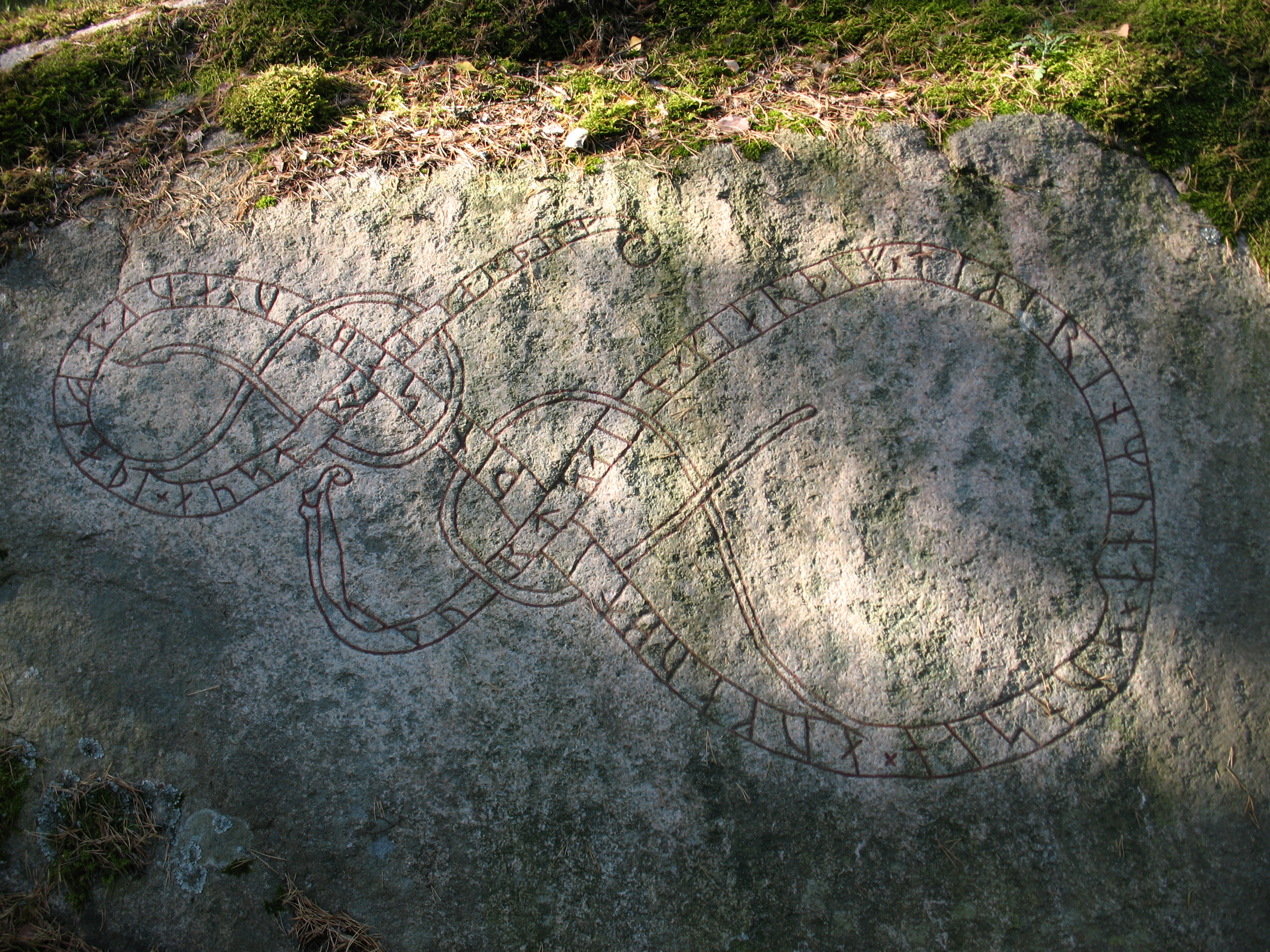
Runestone U 209

This is not properly a runestone but a runic inscription in style Pr4 that has been carved into flat bedrock at Veda. It is dated to the mid-11th century. It was ordered by Þorsteinn who enriched himself in the lands of Rus' in memory of his son. Omeljan Pritsak identifies this Þorsteinn with Þorsteinn, the former commander of a retinue, who is commemorated on the Turinge Runestone. He suggests that Þorsteinn was the commander of the retinue of Yaroslav the Wise and that his son Erinmundr may have died in Garðaríki while serving under his father.

The estate that was bought was probably the farm Veda, where the inscription is located. The inscription is of note as it indicates that the riches that were acquired in Eastern Europe had led to the new procedure of legally buying odal land.

The inscription reads:

þurtsain × kiarþi| |if×tiʀ irinmunt × sun sin auk| |kaubti þinsa bu × auk × aflaþi × austr i karþum
Þorstæinn {} gærði æftiʀ Ærinmund, {} sun sinn, ok køypti þennsa by {} ok {} aflaði {} austr i Garðum.
Þorsteinn made (the stone) in memory of Erinmundr, his son, and bought this estate and earned (wealth) in the east in Garðar (Russia).

==== U 283 ====
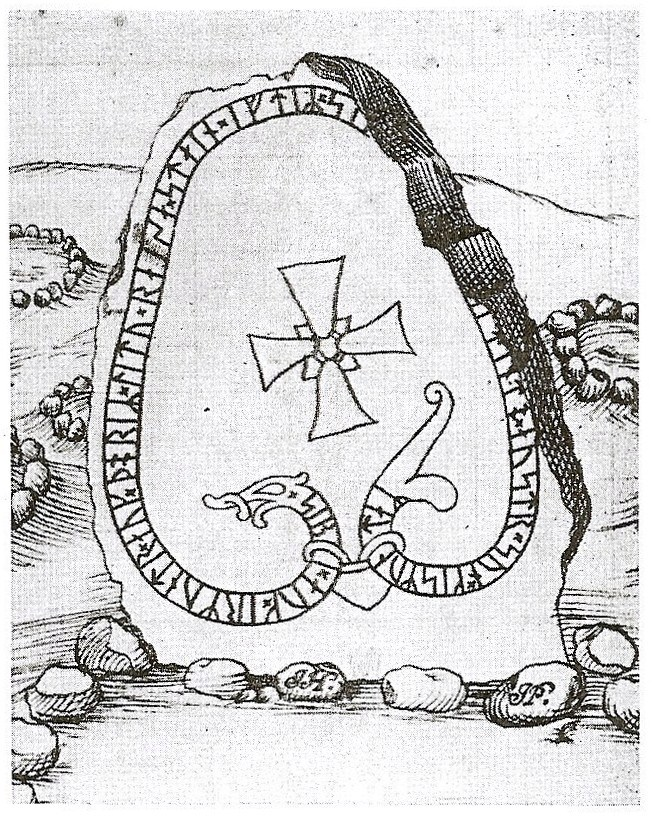
Runestone U 283 in a 17th-century drawing

This runestone was located at the estate of Torsåker but it has disappeared. It was presumably in style Pr3 and made by the runemaster Fot. It was raised by three men in memory of a fourth who had died in the east.

The inscription reads:

[× sibi × auk × irmuntr × auk × þoriʀ × litu × raisa × stain × iftiʀ × s(u)... ... ...-- (h)(a)n · to × austr × sun × kismuntaʀ]
{} Sibbi {} ok {} Ærnmundr {} ok {} Þoriʀ {} letu {} ræisa {} stæin {} æftiʀ {} ... ... ... Hann {} do {} austr, {} sunn {} Gismundaʀ.
Sibbi and Ernmundr and Þórir had the stone raised in memory of ... He, Gísmundr's son, died in the east.

==== U 366 ====
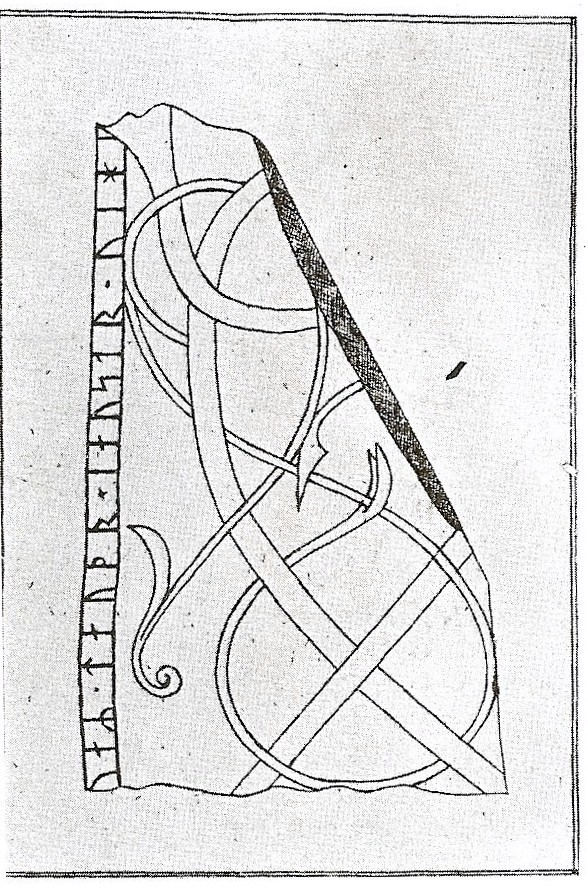
Runestone U 366 in a 17th-century drawing

This runestone was found as fragments at Gådersta and has disappeared but it was probably in style Pr4. It was raised in memory of a man who died on the eastern route.

The inscription reads:

[... uaʀ · tauþr × i austr·uih- ...]
... vaʀ {} dauðr {} i austrveg[i] ...
... died on the eastern route ...

==== U 504 ====
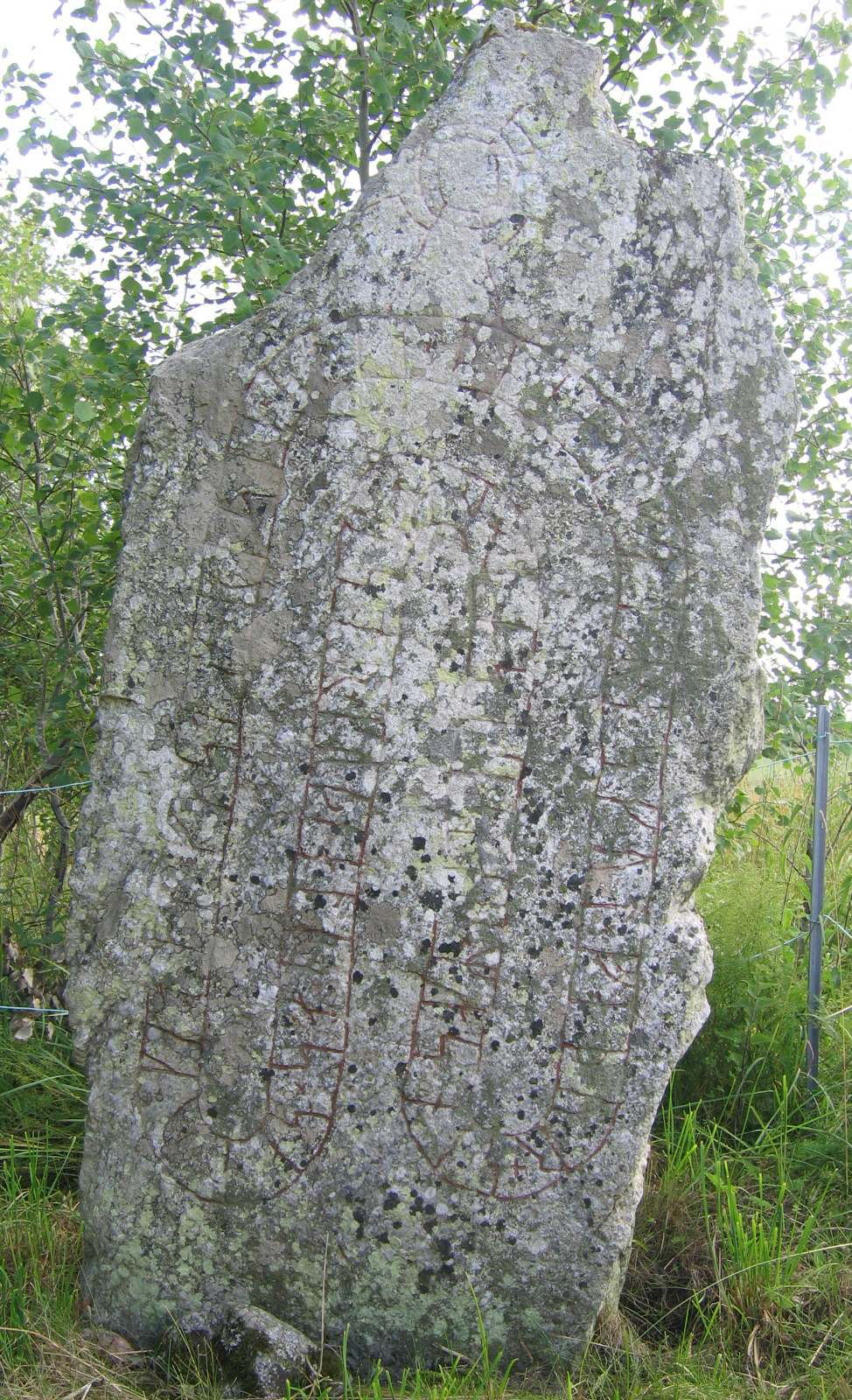
Runestone U 504

This runestone is an early inscription in style RAK without ornamentations. It is located in Ubby and it was raised in memory of a father who had travelled both in the west and in the east.

The inscription reads:

+ kitil×fastr × risti × stin + þina × iftiʀ × askut × faþur + sin × saʀ × uas × uistr × uk × ustr + kuþ ialbi × as × salu
{} Kætilfastr {} ræisti {} stæin {} þenna {} æftiʀ {} Asgaut, {} faður {} sinn. {} Saʀ {} vas {} vestr {} ok {} austr. {} Guð hialpi {} hans {} salu.
Ketilfastr raised this stone in memory of Ásgautr, his father. He was in the west and in the east. May God help his soul.

==== U 636 ====
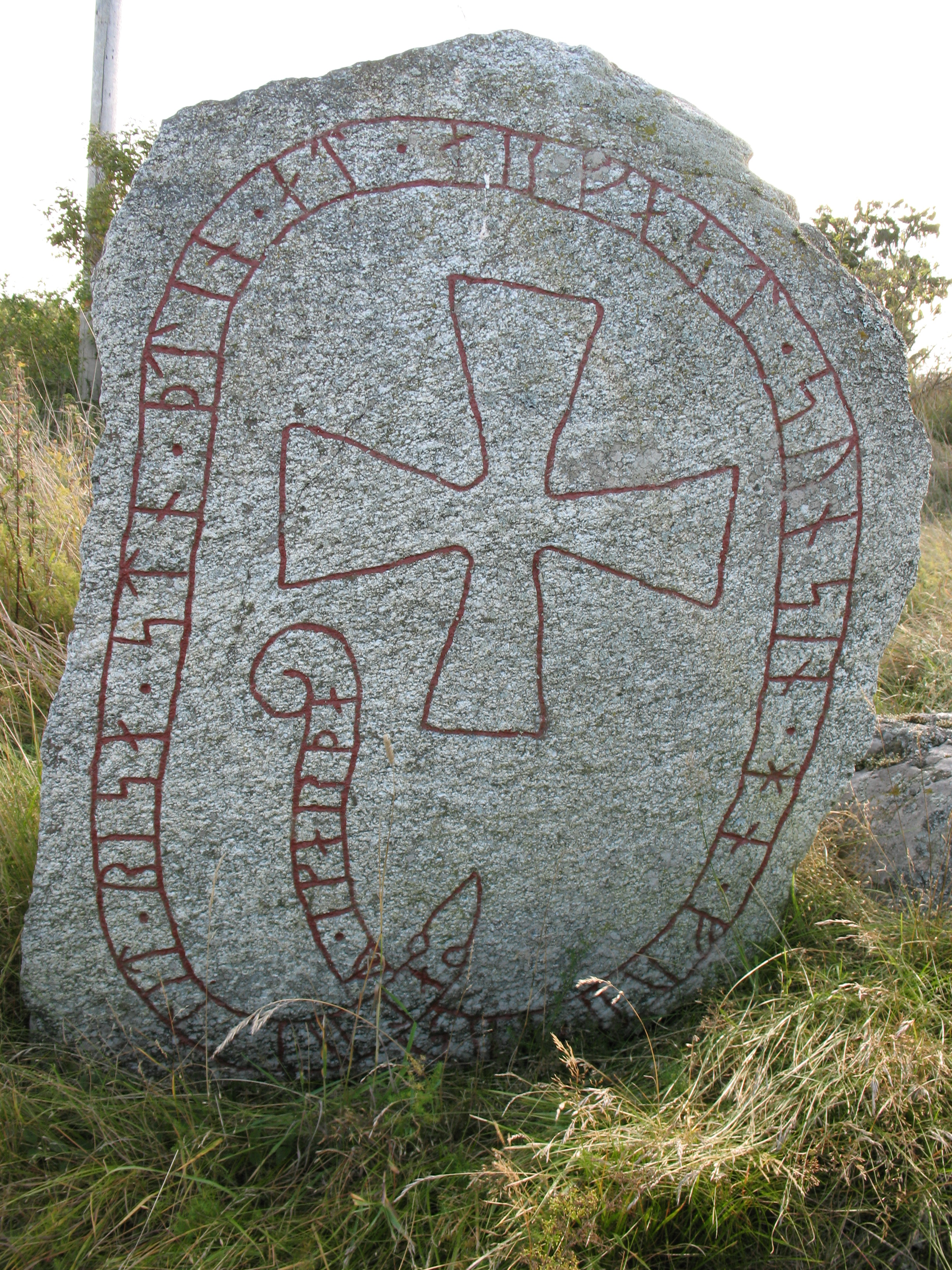
Runestone U 636

This stone is found at Låddersta and it is in the style Fp. It is raised in memory of a son named Arnfast who travelled to Garðaríki. Arnfast is also mentioned on the stone U 635.

There are two readings of i karþa. One interpretation is that it means "to Garðar" or "to Garðaríki", i.e. "to the lands of Rus'". In runic inscriptions, however, that toponym always appears in the plural dative form, suggesting that the singular form i karþa may have referred to a particular town Garðr, i.e. either to Constantinople or to Kiev.

The inscription reads:

alui · lit · risa · stn · þtin · at · arfast · sun sin · hn · fur · ausʀ · i karþa
Alvi {} let {} ræisa {} stæin {} þenna {} at {} Arnfast, {} sun sinn. {} Hann {} for {} austr {} i Garða.
Ǫlvé had this stone raised in memory of Arnfastr, his son. He travelled to the east to Garðar (Russia).

==== U 687 ====
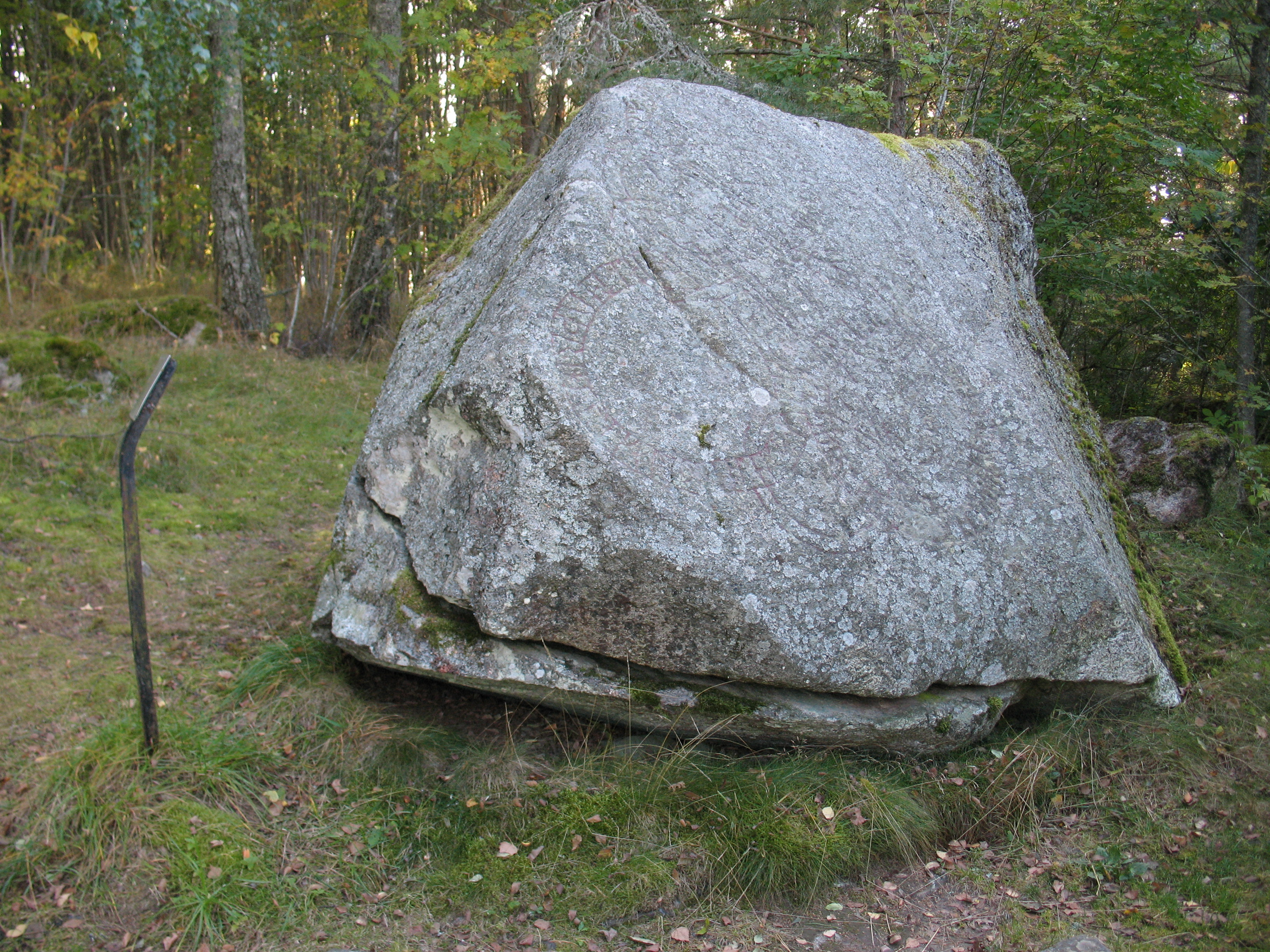
Runestone U 687

This stone, signed by the runemaster Öpir, is found at Sjusta near Skokloster. It is in style Pr4 and it is raised by a woman named Rúna in memory of her four sons who had died. She had it made together with her daughter-in-law Sigríðr who was the widow of Spjallboði. They added that the place where Spjallboði had died was i olafs kriki, and several scholars have discussed the meaning of these runes.

In 1875, Richard Dybeck suggested that kriki represented Old Norse Grikk meaning 'Greece', but in 1891 Sophus Bugge read grið, which means 'retinue'. Later, in 1904, Adolf Noreen interpreted them as krikr, meaning 'hook', but in 1907, Otto von Friesen proposed that the runes read i olafs kirki, i.e. 'in Saint Olaf's Church in Novgorod'. Otto von Friesen's interpretation has since then been the accepted interpretation.

Omeljan Pritsak suggests that Spjallboði died in a fire that destroyed the church in c. 1070–1080. Jansson, on the other hand, attributes the death of Spjallboði in a church to the fact that many of the medieval churches were defensive structures.

The runic text is signed by the runemaster Öpir, who was active during the late 11th and early 12th centuries in Uppland.

The inscription reads:

runa ' lit kiara ' mirki at ' sbialbuþa ' uk ' at ' suain ' uk ' at · antuit ' uk at ' raknaʀ ' suni ' sin ' uk ' ekla ' uk ' siri(þ) ' at ' sbialbuþa ' bonta sin an uaʀ ' tauþr ' i hulmkarþi ' i olafs · kriki ' ubiʀ · risti ' ru
Runa {} let gæra {} mærki at {} Spiallbuða {} ok {} at {} Svæin {} ok {} at {} Andvett {} ok at {} Ragnar, {} syni {} sina {} ok {} Hælga/Ægla/Ængla, {} ok {} Sigrið {} at {} Spiallbuða, {} bonda sinn. Hann vaʀ {} dauðr {} i Holmgarði {} i Olafs {} kirkiu. {} Øpiʀ {} risti {} runaʀ.
Rúna had the landmark made in memory of Spjallboði and in memory of Sveinn and in memory of Andvéttr and in memory of Ragnarr, sons of her and Helgi/Egli/Engli; and Sigríðr in memory of Spjallboði, her husbandman. He died in Holmgarðr in Ólafr's church. Œpir carved the runes.

==== U 898 ====
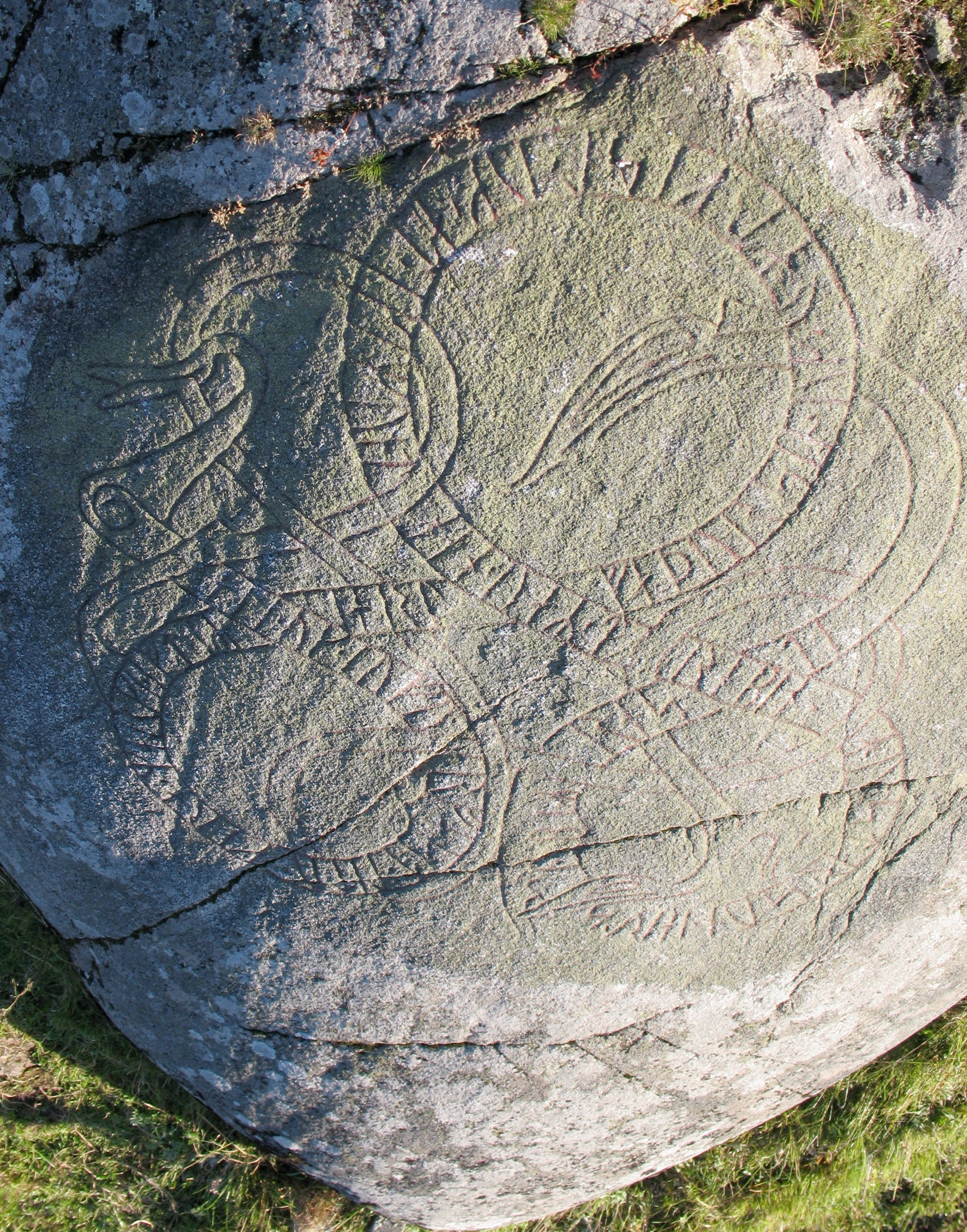
Runestone U 898

This is not properly a runestone but a runic inscription on flat bedrock at Norby. It is in style Pr4 and it is raised in memory of three men, one of whom died in the East. The runic text is signed by the runemaster Öpir.

The inscription reads:

ali ' uk ' iufurfast · litu ' gera ' merki ' iftiʀ iarl faþur sin ' uk ' at ' kisl ' uk ' at ' ikimunt han ' uaʀ ' trebin ' hustr ' sun ' iarls ybiʀ risti
Ali/Alli {} ok {} Iofurfast {} letu {} gæra {} mærki {} æftiʀ Iarl, faður sinn, {} ok {} at {} Gisl {} ok {} at {} Ingimund. Hann {} vaʀ {} drepinn {} austr, {} sunn {} Iarls. Øpiʀ risti.
Áli/Alli and Jǫfurfast had the landmark made in memory of Jarl, their father, and in memory of Gísl and in memory of Ingimundr. He, Jarl's son, was killed in the east. Œpir carved.

=== Södermanland ===
==== Sö 33 ====
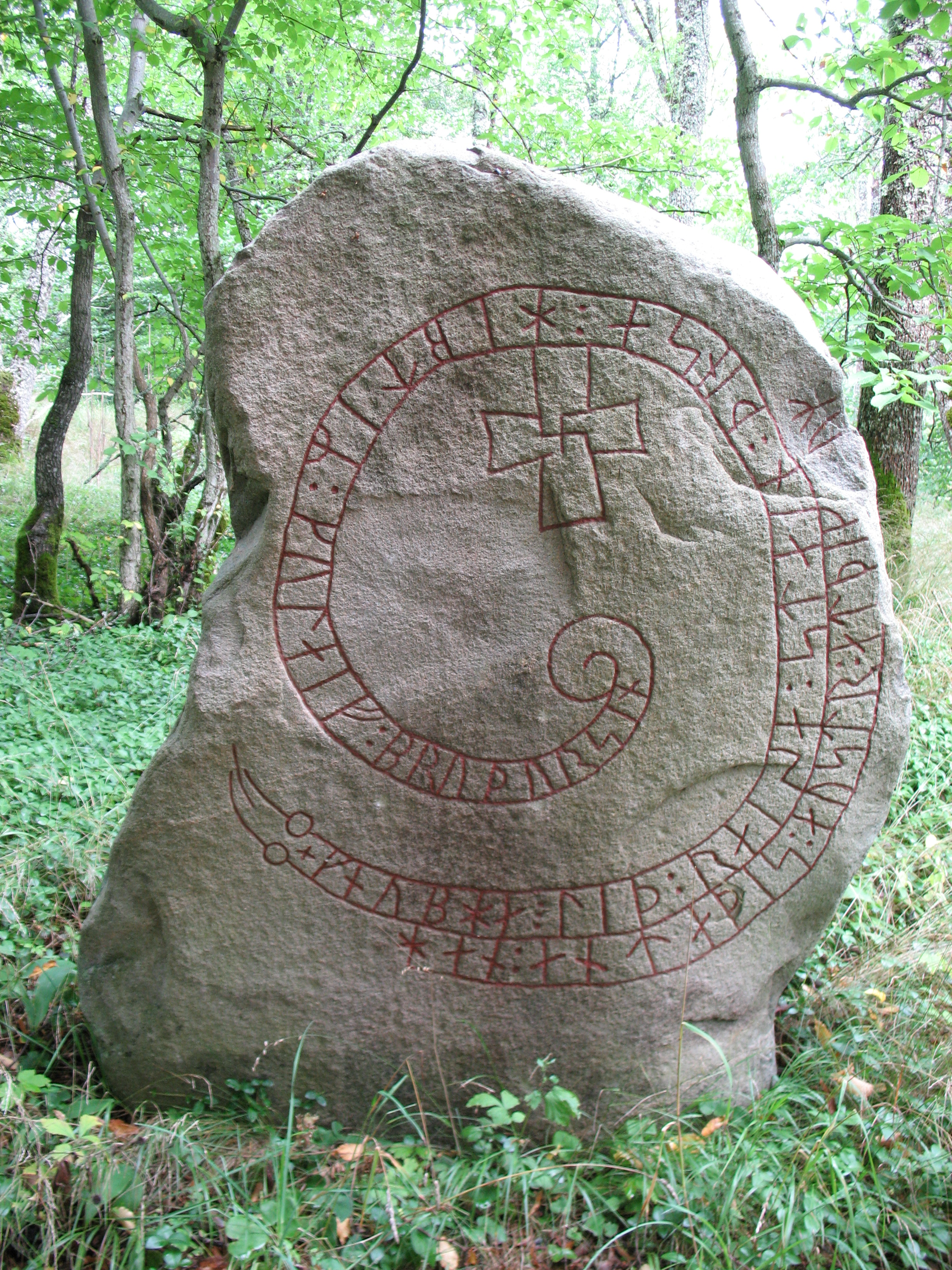
Runestone Sö 33

This runestone is located in Skåäng and it is the style Fp. It was raised in memory of a man who died in an assembly in the east. It is also possible that it says that the man died in a retinue in the east.

The inscription reads:

+ gnubha ~ liþ : raisa : stain : þinsa : hibtiʀ : kulaif : bruþur sin han : antaþis : austr : at þikum
{} Gnupa {} let {} ræisa {} stæin {} þennsa {} æftiʀ {} Guðlæif, {} broður sinn. Hann {} ændaðis {} austr {} at þingum.
Gnúpa had this stone raised in memory of Gulleifr, his brother. He met his end in the east at the Assembly.

==== Sö 34 ====
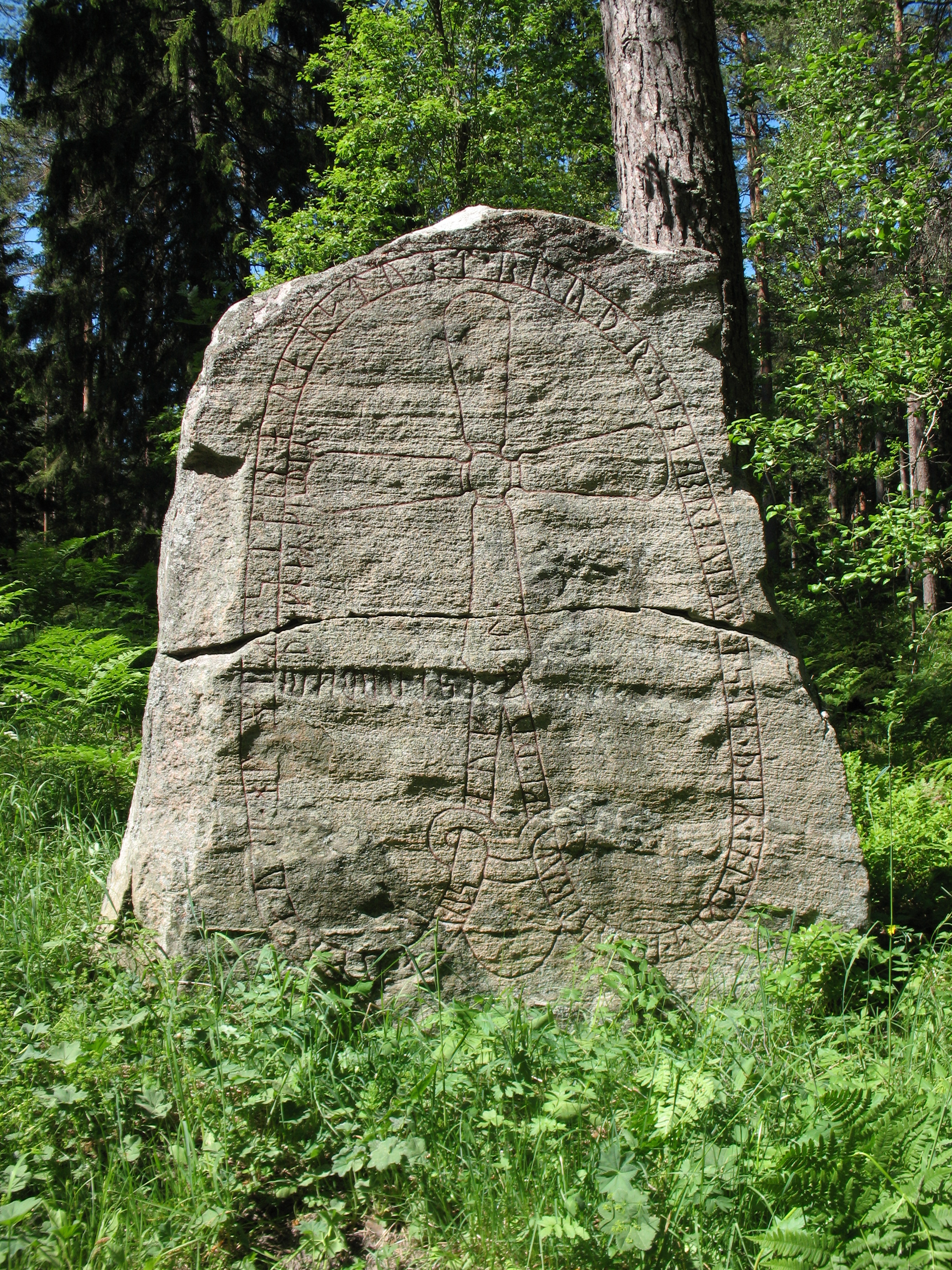
Runestone Sö 34

Styrlaugʀ ok Holmbʀ stæina ræistu...
A reading of the runestone Sö 34's text in Old East Norse.

This runestone is located at a path called Tjuvstigen ('thief trail') and is carved in runestone style KB. This is the classification for inscriptions with a cross that is bordered by the runic text. The runic text states that it was raised in memory of two brothers who were þiægnaʀ goðiʀ or 'good thegns', which was a class of retainer, and who died somewhere in the East. This same phrase is used in its singular form on runestones Vg 8 from Hjälstad and DR 143 from Gunderup. About fifty memorial runestones describe the deceased as being a thegn.

The inscription reads:

styrlaugʀ · auk · hulmbʀ · staina · raistu · at · bryþr · sina · brau(t)u · nesta · þaiʀ · entaþus · i · austruiki · þurkil · auk sturbiarn þiaknaʀ · kuþiʀ
Styrlaugʀ {} ok {} Holmbʀ {} stæina {} ræistu {} at {} brøðr {} sina, {} brautu {} næsta. {} Þæiʀ {} ændaðus {} i {} austrvegi, {} Þorkell {} ok Styrbiorn, þiægnaʀ {} goðiʀ.
Styrlaugr and Holmr raised the stones next to the path in memory of their brothers. They met their end on the eastern route, Þorkell and Styrbjôrn, good Þegns.

==== Sö 92 ====
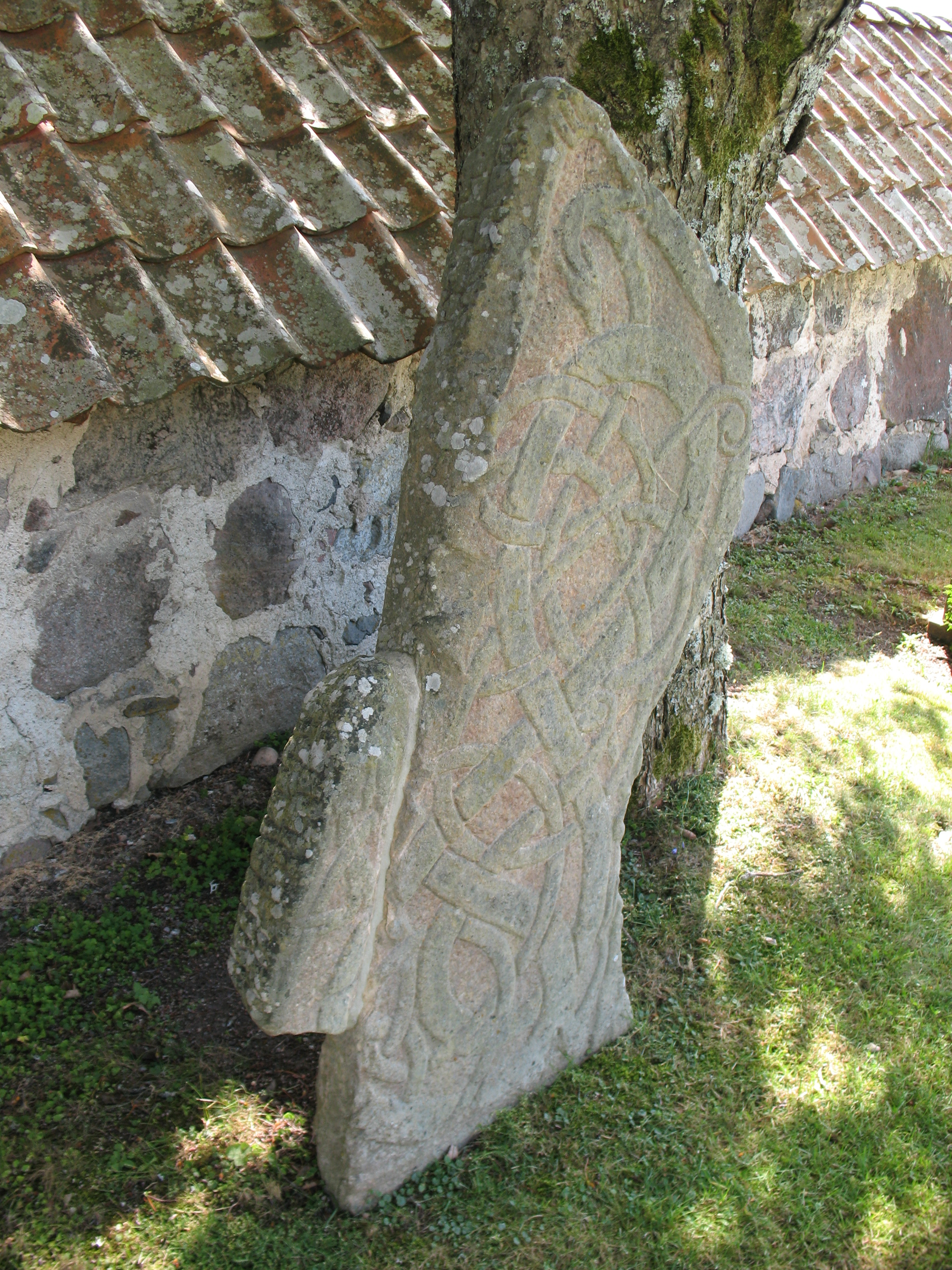
Runestone Sö 92

This runestone is found at the cemetery of Husby. Its front side is completely covered in illustrations and it is attributed to style Pr3-Pr4. It was carved by the runemaster Balle in memory of someone's brother who died in the East.

The inscription reads:

... · lit · raisa · st... ... rysu · br(o)... · sin · ha... ... austr · bali ...
... {} let {} ræisa {} st[æin] ... Rysiu(?), {} bro[ður] {} sinn. {} Ha[nn] ... austr. {} Balli ...
... had the stone raised ... Rysja(?), his brother. He ... east. Balli ...

==== Sö 121 ====
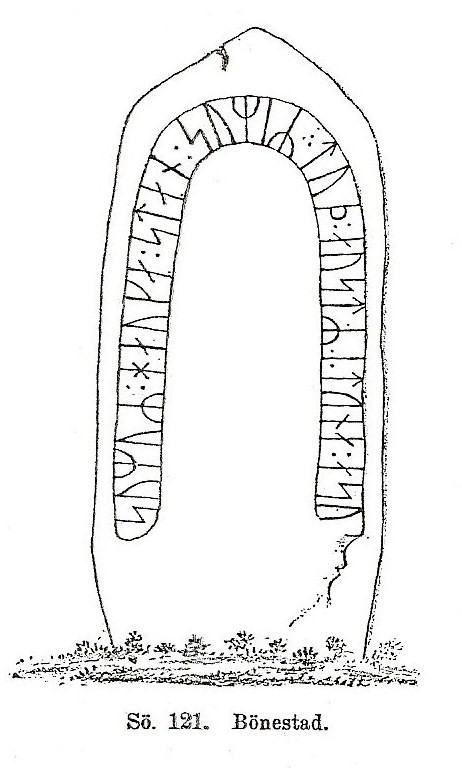
Runestone Sö 121

This runestone has disappeared but was located in Bönestad. It was made in the style RAK in memory of a man who died in the East.

The inscription reads:

[sumuʀ : hauka : stan : sum iʀ : tuþ : austʀ · i : tuna : as(u)]
<sumuʀ> {} haggva {} stæin, {} sum eʀ {} dauð {} austr {} i {} <tuna> {} <asu>.
<sumuʀ> cut the stone, who died in the east in <tuna> ...

==== Sö 126 ====
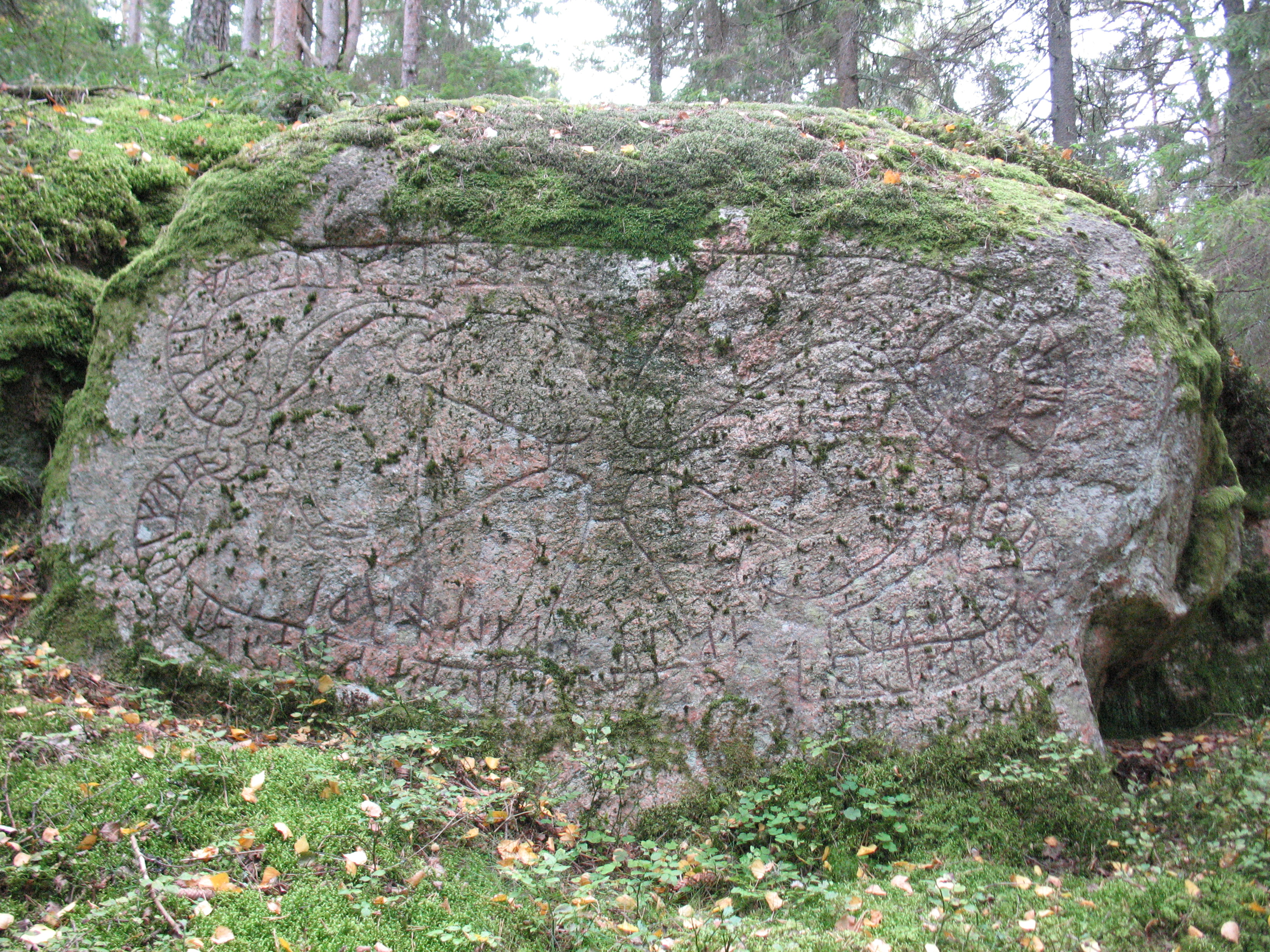
Runestone Sö 126

This runestone is a runic inscription on flat bedrock in Fagerlöt. It is in the style Pr2-Pr3 and it was made in memory of a man named Áskell who fell in battle in the East. The second sentence of the inscription is in the meter fornyrðislag, and it contains a virtually unique use of the Old Norse word grimmr ('cruel') in the sense "commander". Áskell's title folksgrimmr may be the title that the commander had in the druzhina of Yaroslav I the Wise in Novgorod.

The inscription reads:

hu(l)(m)(f)riþ · ilin--r · [þ]aʀ · litu · hakua · stain · eftiʀ eskil · faþur · sin · han · trauh · orustu · i · austru[i]hi aþaa · fulks·krimʀ · fala · orþi
Holmfriðr, {} <ilin--r>, {} þaʀ {} letu {} haggva {} stæin {} æftiʀ Æskel, {} faður {} sinn. {} Hann {} draug {} orrustu {} i {} austrvegi, aðan {} folksgrimʀ {} falla {} orði.
Holmfríðr (and) <ilin--r>, they had the stone cut in memory of Áskell, their father. He engaged in battle on the eastern route, before the people's commander wrought his fall.

==== Sö 130 ====
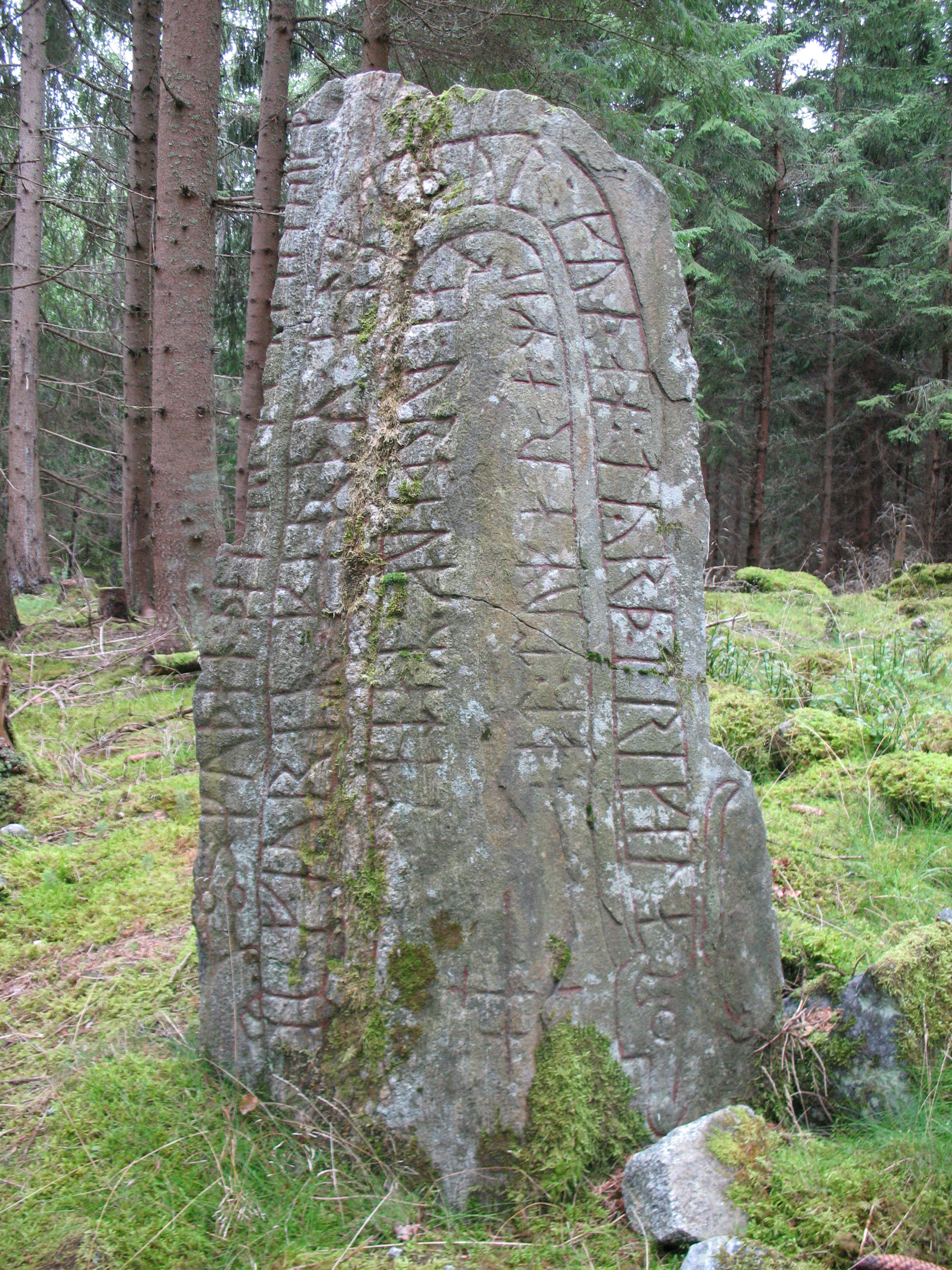
Runestone Sö 130

This runestone is found near a homestead named Hagstugan. It is either style Fp or possibly style Pr1 and it is raised in memory of a man who fell in what is today Russia. It is composed in fornyrðislag and the last line, which contains cipher runes, was decoded by Elias Wessén. It is from the first half of the 11th century.

The inscription reads:

fiuriʀ : kirþu : at : faþur : kuþan : tyrþ : trikela : at : tumara : miltan : urþa uk : mataʀ kuþan : þat · (u)-(h)---(u)--(u)(k)(þ)
Fiuriʀ {} gærðu {} at {} faður {} goðan {} dyrð {} drængila {} at {} Domara/domara, {} mildan {} orða ok {} mataʀ goðan, {} þat {} ...
Four (sons) made the magnificence in memory of (their) good father, valiantly in memory of Dómari/the judge, gentle in speech and free with food ...

h^a l^f {} kirþu <o>
Hann(?) fiall(?) [i(?)] Garðum(?) ...
He(?) fell(?) in(?) Garðar(?) (Russia) ..."

==== Sö 148 ====
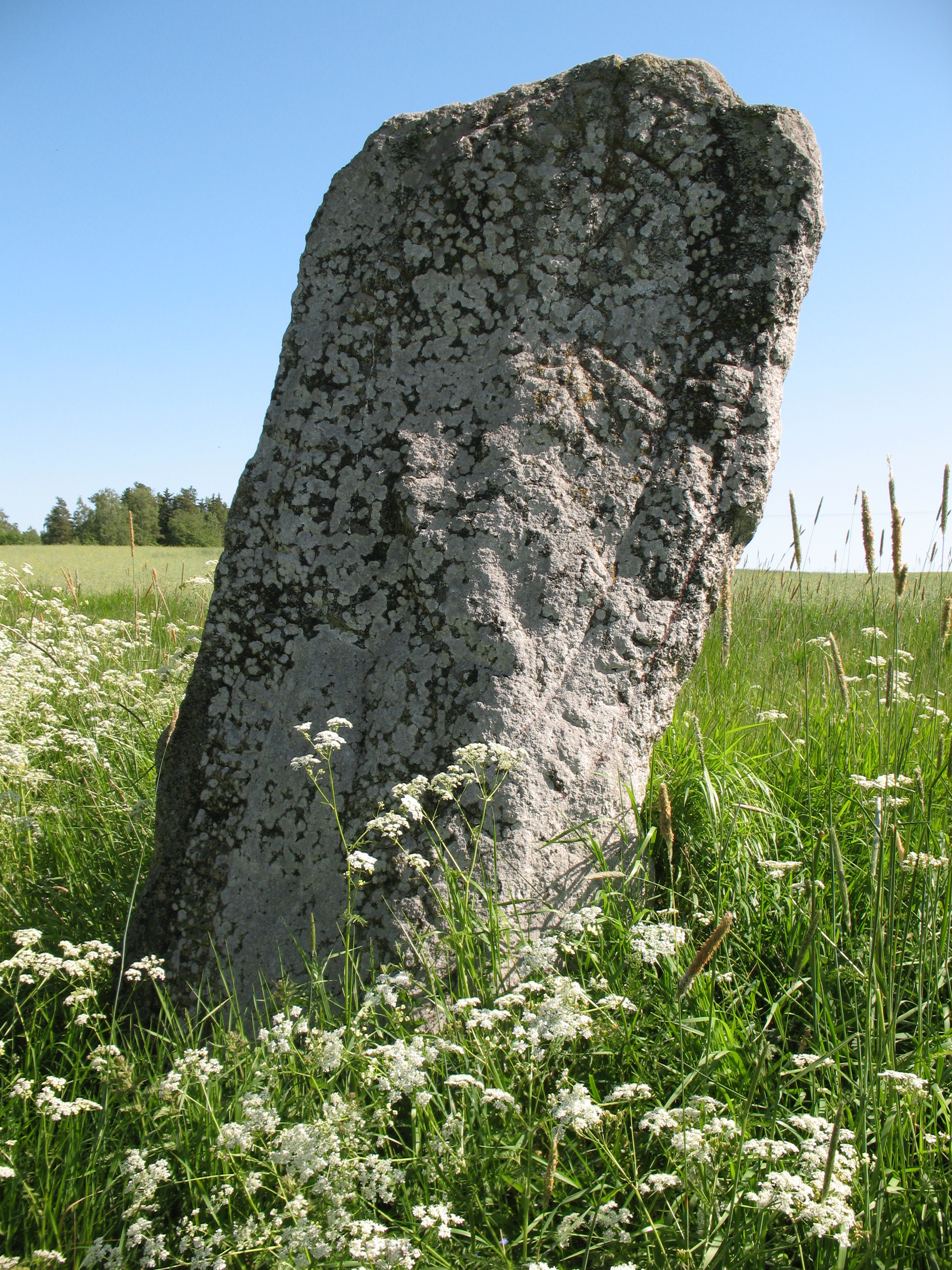
Runestone Sö 148

This runestone is found in Innberga and it was raised in memory of a man who died in what is today Russia. It is dated to the first half of the 11th century.

The inscription reads:

þiuþulfʀ : bui : þaiʀ : raisþu : stain þansi : at : farulf : faþur : sin : han uas antaþ austr i kaþ(u)(m)
Þiuðulfʀ, {} Boi, {} þæiʀ {} ræisþu {} stæin þannsi {} at {} Farulf, {} faður {} sinn. {} Hann vas ændaðr austr i Garðum.
Þjóðulfr (and) Búi, they raised this stone in memory of Farulfr, their father. He met his end in the east in Garðar (Russia).

==== Sö 171 ====
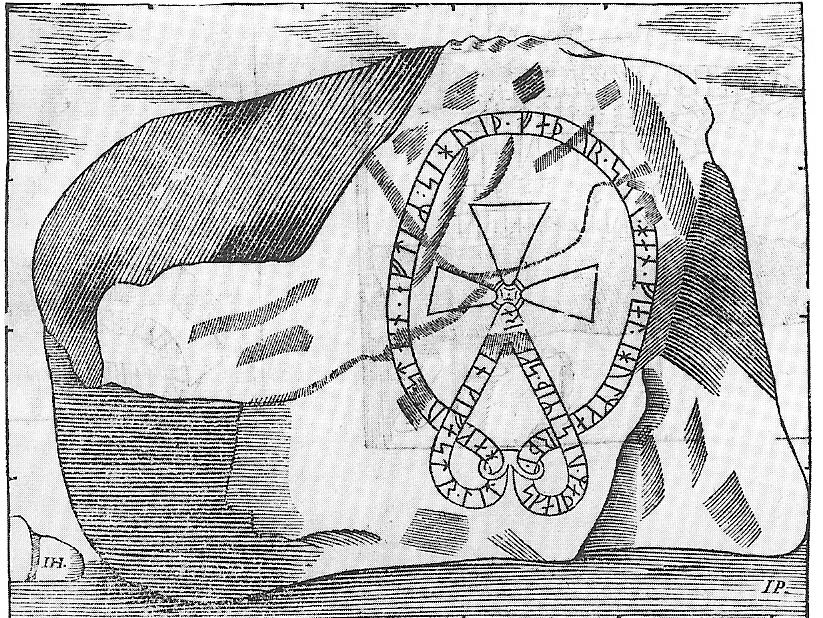
Runestone Sö 171 in the 17th-century drawing by Johan Peringskiöld that has preserved the message of the runic inscription

This runestone is a boulder that was found in Esta, and it was made in memory of the captain of a ship who died in Novgorod. The boulder is badly damaged due to weathering, but thanks to a 17th-century drawing scholars know what it said. Three parts of the stone are located in the Swedish Museum of National Antiquities in Stockholm.

According to Jansson, the runestone testifies to the unrest that could appear in the important marketplace of Novgorod, and it was not only the captain who died, but also the entire crew. Omeljan Pritsak, on the other hand, thinks that the deceased had probably died in the service of the Novgorodian prince in the first half of the 11th century. The second half of the inscription is in the fornyrðislag meter.

The inscription reads:

(i)nk(i)f(a)[s]tr · l[i](t) (h)(a)ku... st(a)...n · eftiʀ · sihuiþ · faþ-r · si[n · han · fial · i h]ul(m)[karþi · skaiþaʀ · uisi mi]þ · ski...ra
Ingifastr {} let haggv[a] stæ[i]n {} æftiʀ {} Sigvið, {} fað[u]r {} sinn. {} Hann {} fioll {} i Holmgarði, {} skæiðaʀ {} visi með {} ski[pa]ra.
Ingifastr had the stone cut in memory of Sigviðr, his father. He fell in Holmgarðr, the ship's leader with the seamen.

==== Sö 216 ====
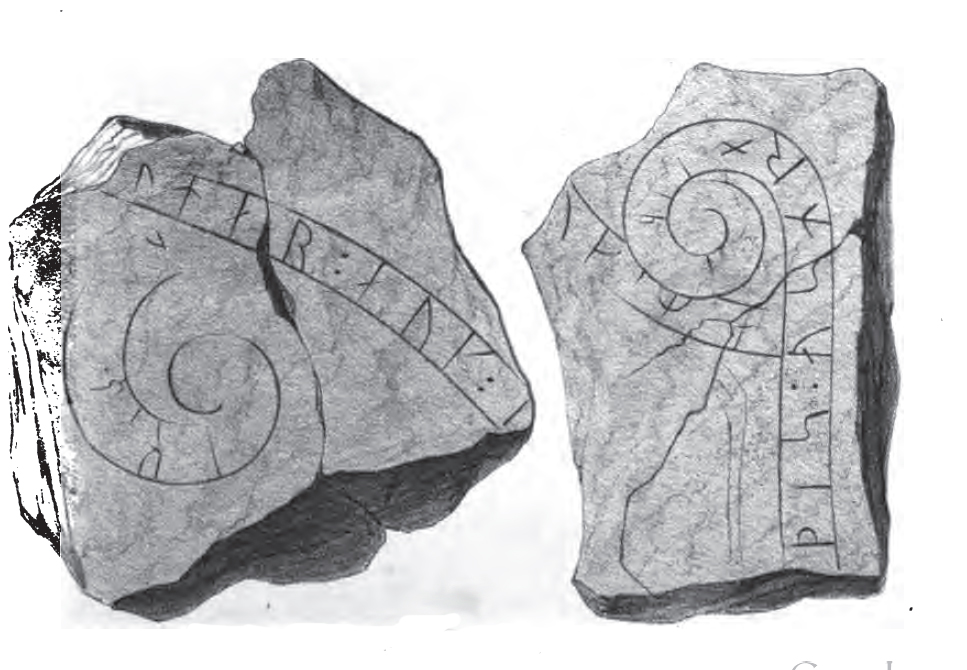
Runestone Sö 216, 19th-century drawing by Richard Dybeck

This runestone was found as a fragment in Aska, but it has disappeared. What remained said that it was made in memory of a man who died in the East.

The inscription reads:

[(u)tar : auk : -... ... ...þis : a^ustr × ...uk-ma]
Ottarr {} ok {} ... ... [ænda]ðis {} austr {} ...
Óttarr and ... met his end in the east ...

==== Sö 308 ====
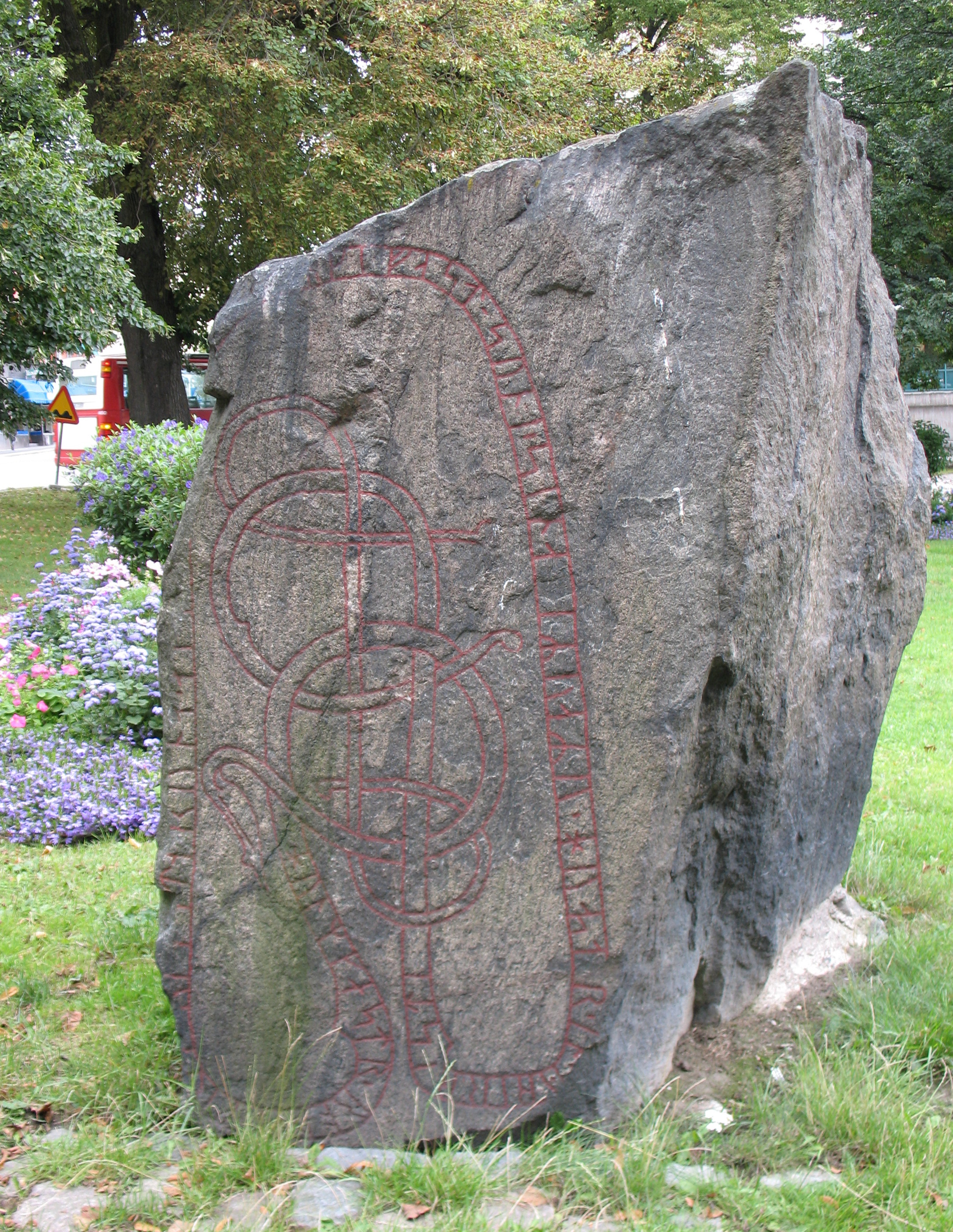
Runestone Sö 308

This runestone is a runic inscription by the runemaster Öpir in the style Pr5 on a large boulder. It is located outside the railroad station in Södertälje. It was made in memory of two men who were in the east. The runic text is signed by the runemaster Öpir, and uses a bind rune to combine the a-rune and s-rune in the word hua^str, which is tentatively translated as austr ('east'). Öpir used the same a^s bind rune in inscription U 485 in Marma.

The inscription reads:

hulmfastr ' roþelfr ' ---u ' [ri]sta ' run[a] ' a- ... ... (i)kifast ' suni : sina ['] -iʀ ua(ʀ)u · hua^str · i(n) · ybir risti
Holmfastr, {} Roðælfʀ, {} [let]u {} rista {} runaʀ {} a[t] ... ... Ingifast, {} syni {} sina, {} [þ]æiʀ vaʀu {} austr(?)/vestr. {} En {} Øpiʀ risti.
Holmfastr (and) Hróðelfr had the runes carved in memory of ... Ingifastr, their sons. They were in the east(?)/west. And Œpir carved.

==== Sö 338 ====
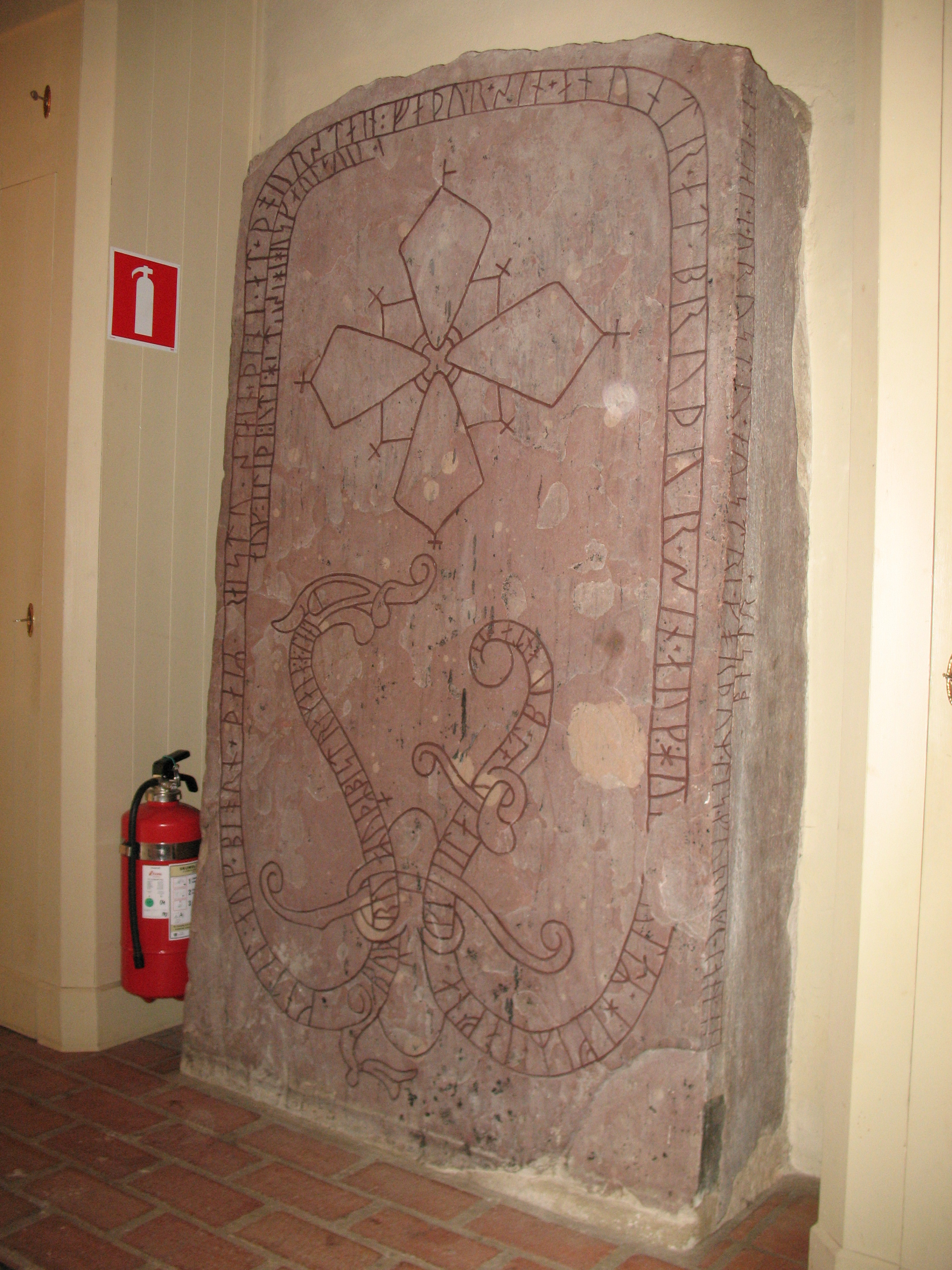
Runestone Sö 338

This is a runestone raised in the church of Turinge. It is in sandstone, in the style Pr4 and it was made in memory of the chieftain of a warband. It is the most verbose of all the Varangian stones, and it was probably made in the mid-11th century.

Omeljan Pritsak identifies this Þorsteinn with Þorsteinn of the Veda inscription, who bought an estate for his son with money earned in the lands of Rus'. He suggests that Þorsteinn was the commander of the retinue of Yaroslav I the Wise and that his son Erinmundr may have died in Garðaríki while serving under his father.

The inscription reads:

· ketil : auk + biorn + þaiʀ + raistu + stain + þin[a] + at + þourstain : faþur + sin + anuntr + at + bruþur + sin + auk : hu[skar]laʀ + hifiʀ + iafna + ketilau at + buanta sin · ¶ bruþr uaʀu þaʀ bistra mana : a : lanti auk : i liþi : uti : h(i)(l)(t)u sini huska(r)la : ui- +
{} Kætill {} ok {} Biorn {} þæiʀ {} ræistu {} stæin {} þenna {} at {} Þorstæin, {} faður {} sinn, {} Anundr {} at {} broður {} sinn {} ok {} huskarlaʀ {} æftiʀ(?) {} iafna, {} Kætiløy at {} boanda sinn. {} {} Brøðr vaʀu þæiʀ bæstra manna, {} a {} landi ok {} i liði {} uti, {} heldu sina huskarla {} ve[l]. {}
Ketill and Bjǫrn, they raised this stone in memory of Þorsteinn, their father; Ǫnundr in memory of his brother and the housecarls in memory of the just(?) (and) Ketiley in memory of her husbandman. These brothers were the best of men in the land and abroad in the retinue, held their housecarls well.

han + fial + i + urustu + austr + i + garþum + lis + furugi + lanmana + bestr
Hann {} fioll {} i {} orrustu {} austr {} i {} Garðum, {} liðs {} forungi, {} landmanna {} bæstr.
He fell in battle in the east in Garðar (Russia), commander of the retinue, the best of landholders.

=== Västmanland ===
==== Vs 1 ====
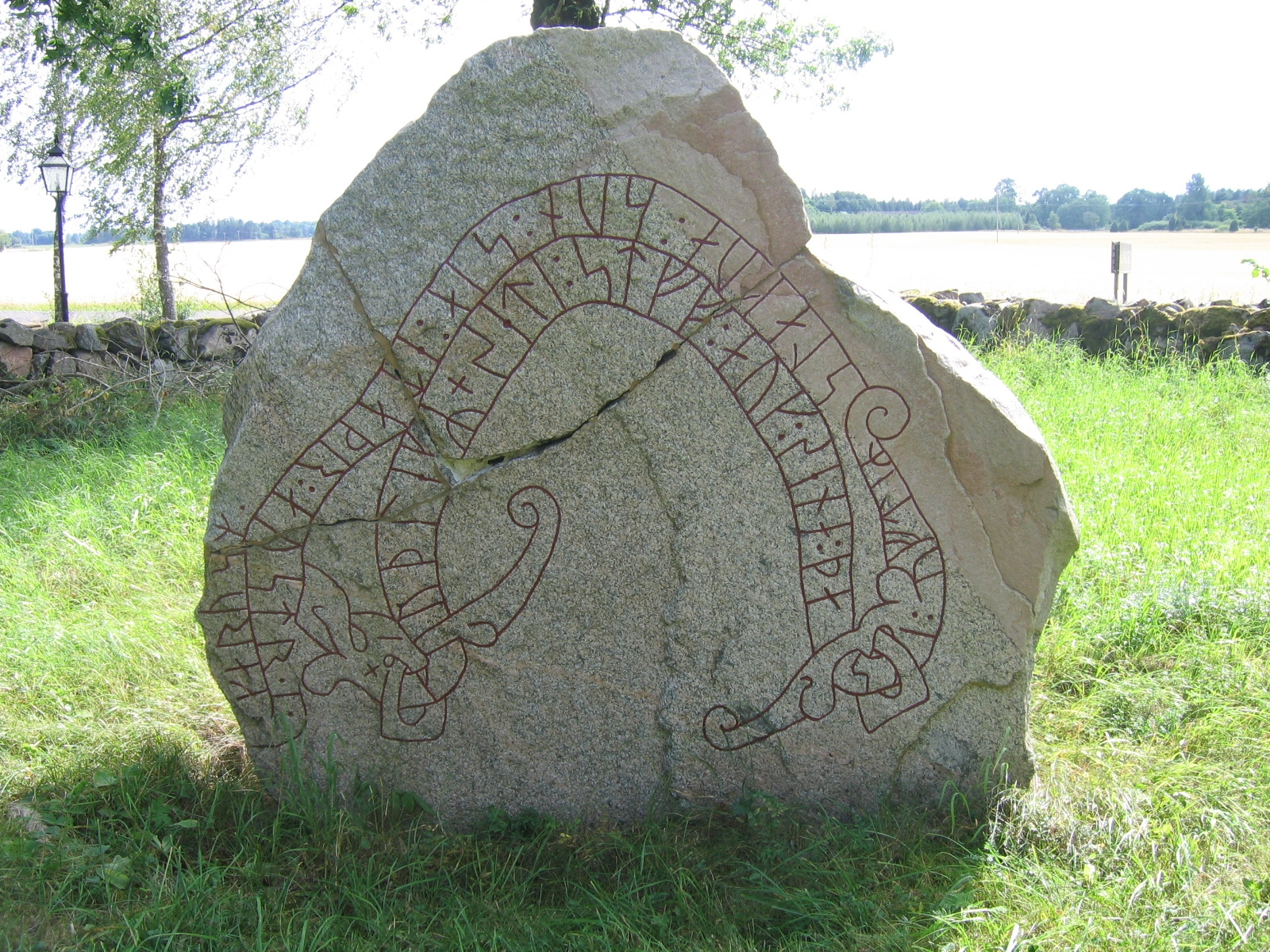
Runestone Vs 1

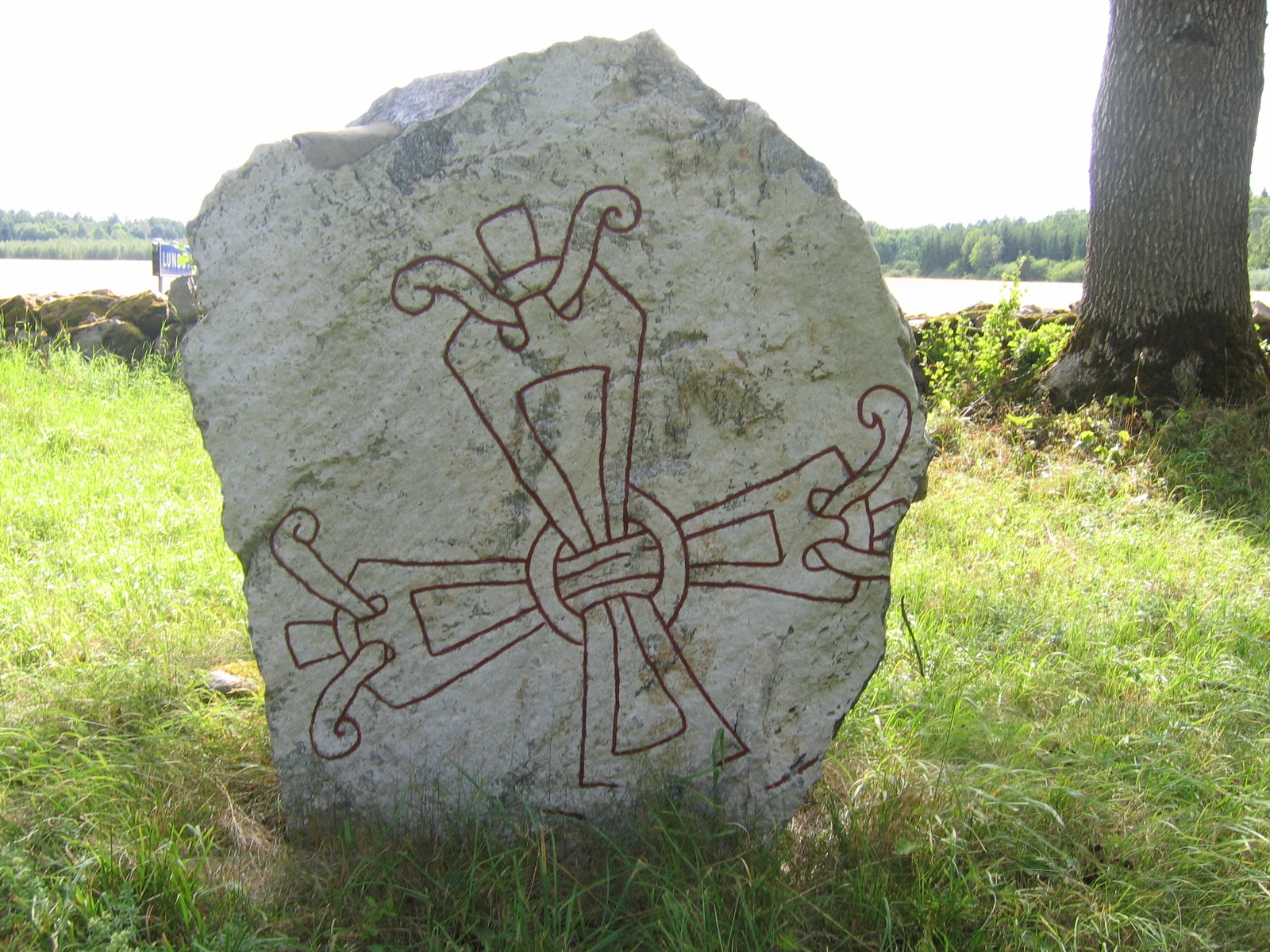
The accompanying image stone Vs 2

This runestone was discovered in 1938 in the ruins of the church of Stora Rytterne. It forms a monument together with image stone Vs 2, and it was raised in memory of a son who died either in what is today Russia or in Khwarezm in Persia.

Jansson, who was the first scholar to publish an analysis of the inscription, suggested in 1940 that i · karusm was a misspelling for i krþum (i garðum, 'in Gardariki'). However, in 1946, he discovered that it may refer to Khwarezm in Central Asia. He proposed that it may be one of the Ingvar Runestones and that it tells where the Ingvar expedition ultimately ended in 1041. The archaeologist Ture J. Arne criticized this analysis claiming that although a Viking chieftain could arrive to the Caspian Sea in 922, when Vikings met Ibn Fadlan, such a voyage would not have been possible in the 1040s. Arne instead accepted Jansson's first analysis of the inscription.

The Rundata project retains Khwarezm as an equal possibility, and Omeljan Pritsak notes that karusm agrees with *qarus-m which is what the Middle Turkic form of Khwarezm would have been. Moreover, Pritsak notes that Arne was wrong in his claim that it would have been impossible for Ingvar to go to Kwarezm at the time. On the contrary, there were no obstacles for such a voyage during the period 1035–1041.

The inscription is somewhat unusual in that the sponsor's name kuþlefʀ, which is the first word in the inscription, is preceded and followed by a cross, perhaps done to draw attention.

The inscription reads:

+ kuþlefʀ + seti : stff : auk : sena : þasi : uftiʀ slakua : sun : sia : etaþr : austr · i · karusm ·
{} Guðlæifʀ {} satti {} staf {} ok {} stæina {} þasi {} æftiʀ Slagva, {} sun {} sinn, {} ændaðr {} austr {} i {} Garðum(?)/Chorezm(?). {}
Guðleifr placed the staff and these stones in memory of Slagvi, his son, (who) met his end in the east in Garðar(?)/Chorezm(?).

==== Vs Fv1988;36 ====
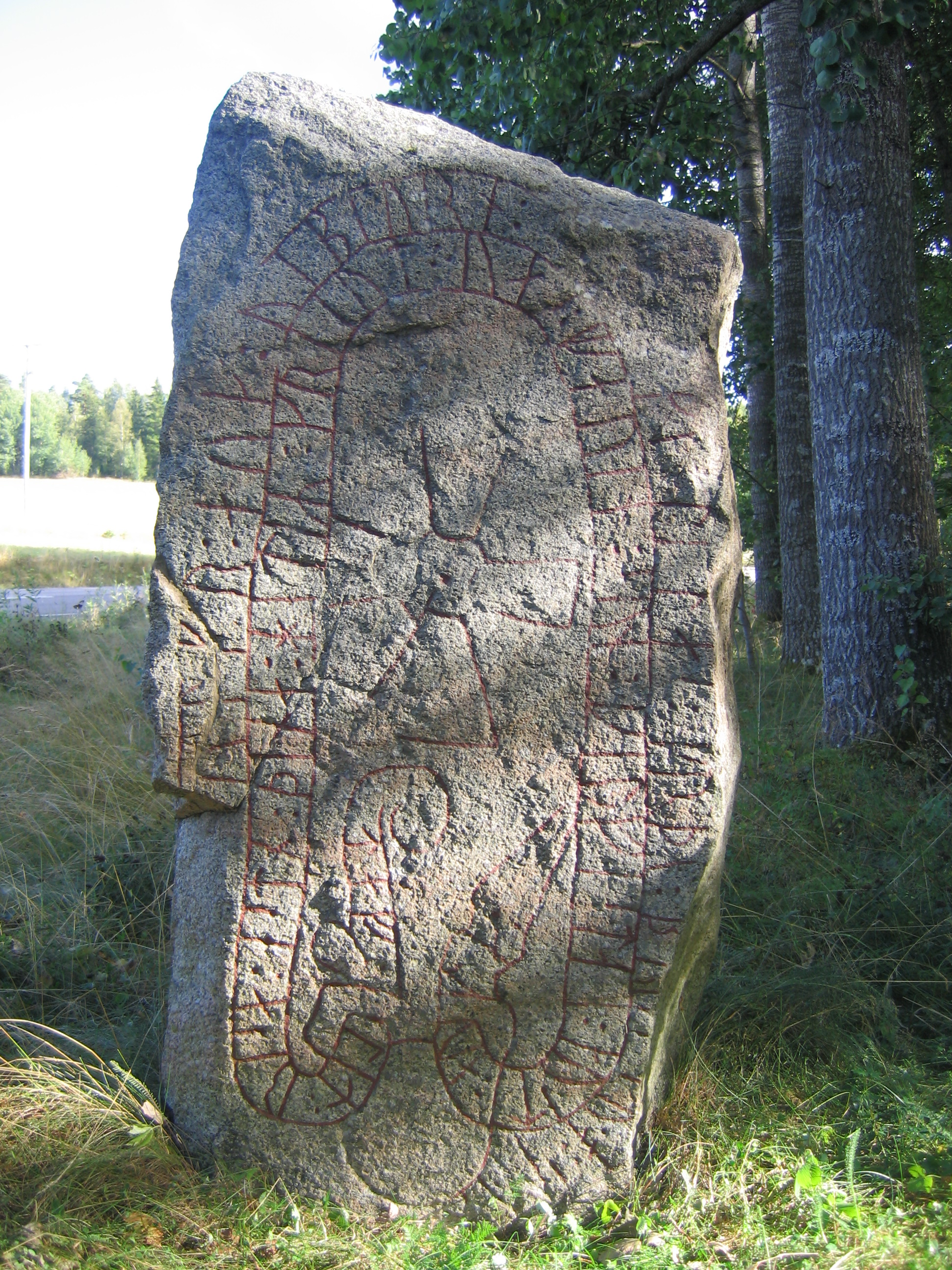
Runestone Vs Fv1988;36

This runestone is carved in runestone style Fp and was raised in memory of Grímmundr who travelled to the east. It was discovered in 1986 at Jädra near Västerås, when stones were removed from a field. It is a lightly reddish stone which is granular and finely textured. The surface of the inscription is even but it is damaged due to flaking, making parts of the inscription difficult to read. It is 2.27 m tall, 0.9 m wide and 0.33 m thick. It is of note that the inscription when discovered still carried traces of its original colouring, which was determined to be of iron oxide but without any noticeable traces of binding material. The nuance appears to have been the same the one used by the Department of Runes when repainting runes in modern days. The stone is of historic note as it mentions the construction of a bridge on the old trail from Badelunda and lake Mälaren to the district of Dalarna.

The Rundata designation for this Västmanland inscription, Vs Fv1988;36, refers to the year and page number of the issue of Fornvännen in which the runestone was first described.

The inscription reads:

taf : lit : risa : estn : þina : hitiʀ : kri(m)ut ~ uas : farin : sun : (u)iþfast-- : aust:arla ulfr : auk : uibiurn : -... kitilas : krþi : b-...(u) · (o) : s---
Taf(?) {} let {} ræisa {} stæin {} þenna {} æftiʀ {} Grimmund. {} Vaʀ {} farinn, {} sunn {} Viðfast[aʀ], {} austarla. Ulfʀ {} ok {} Vibiorn {} ... Kætilas(?)/Kætilhôss(?) {} gærðu {} b[ryggi]u {} a {} ...
Taf(?) had this stone raised in memory of Grímmundr. The son of Viðfastr travelled to the east. Ulfr and Vébjǫrn ... Ketilas(?)/Ketilhǫss(?) made the bridge at ...

=== Östergötland ===
==== Ög 8 ====
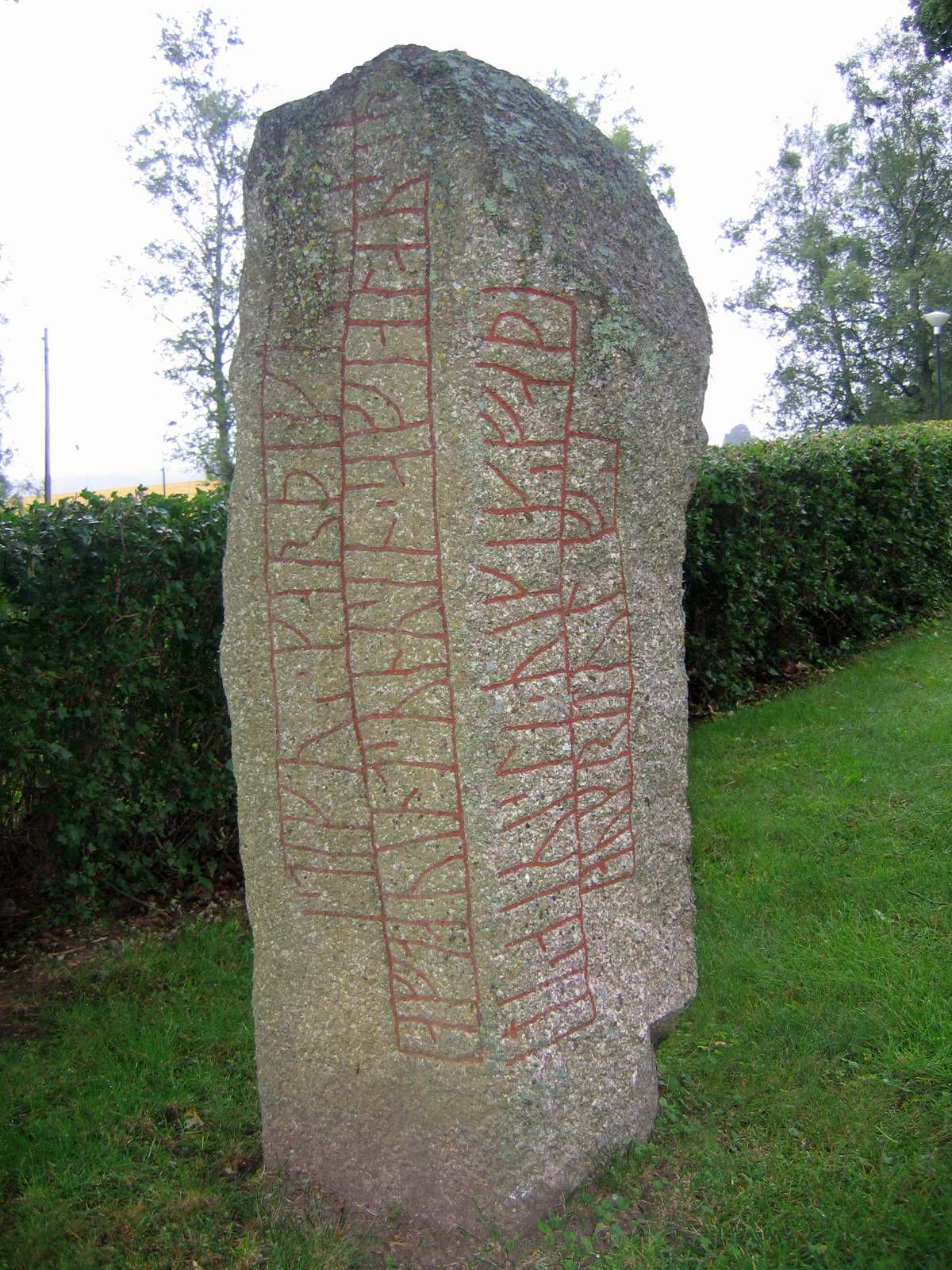
Runestone Ög 8

The Kälvesten stone in Östergötland is dated to the 9th century. It is the oldest inscription that mentions a Viking chieftain leading an expedition eastwards, and many other chieftains would follow in his wake. Unfortunately, it does not tell the exact destination of the Viking expedition.

In the inscription, the runes aukrimulfʀ are to be read as auk krimulfʀ and the k rune,, thus represents two letters at the same time. The runes represent the common Norse name Grímulfr, which was in use all over Scandinavia. It is of note that the name appears in such an old runestone as the other runic attestations of the name are considerably younger, and the name was common in medieval Norway. The name of the deceased, Eyvindr, is a common name in Swedish runic inscriptions, but not Eivísl, the name of the chieftain of the expedition. The only other secure attestation appears on the contemporary Sparlösa Runestone in Västergötland. Since the name appears on two runestones from roughly the same time and in two districts that were culturally closely connected, the name may refer to the same person on the two runestones. Unfortunately, the Sparlösa Runestone is damaged in several places and although it mentions a battle and although there are images like birds hovering above the rigging of a ship, scholars cannot be certain that it refers to a chieftain who had fallen in battle. The identification between the name Eivísl on the two runestones will remain a hypothesis.

The inscription reads:

stikuʀ (') karþi kubl þ(a)^(u) aft auint sunu sin ' sa fial austr
Styguʀ/Stygguʀ {} gærði kumbl þau aft Øyvind, sunu sinn. {} Sa fioll austr
Stigr/Styggr made this monument in memory of Eyvindr, his son. He fell in the east

miʀ aiuisli ' uikikʀ faþi auk| |krimulfʀ
með Æivisli. {} Vikingʀ faði ok Grimulfʀ.
with Eivísl. Víkingr coloured and Grímulfr.

==== Ög 30 ====
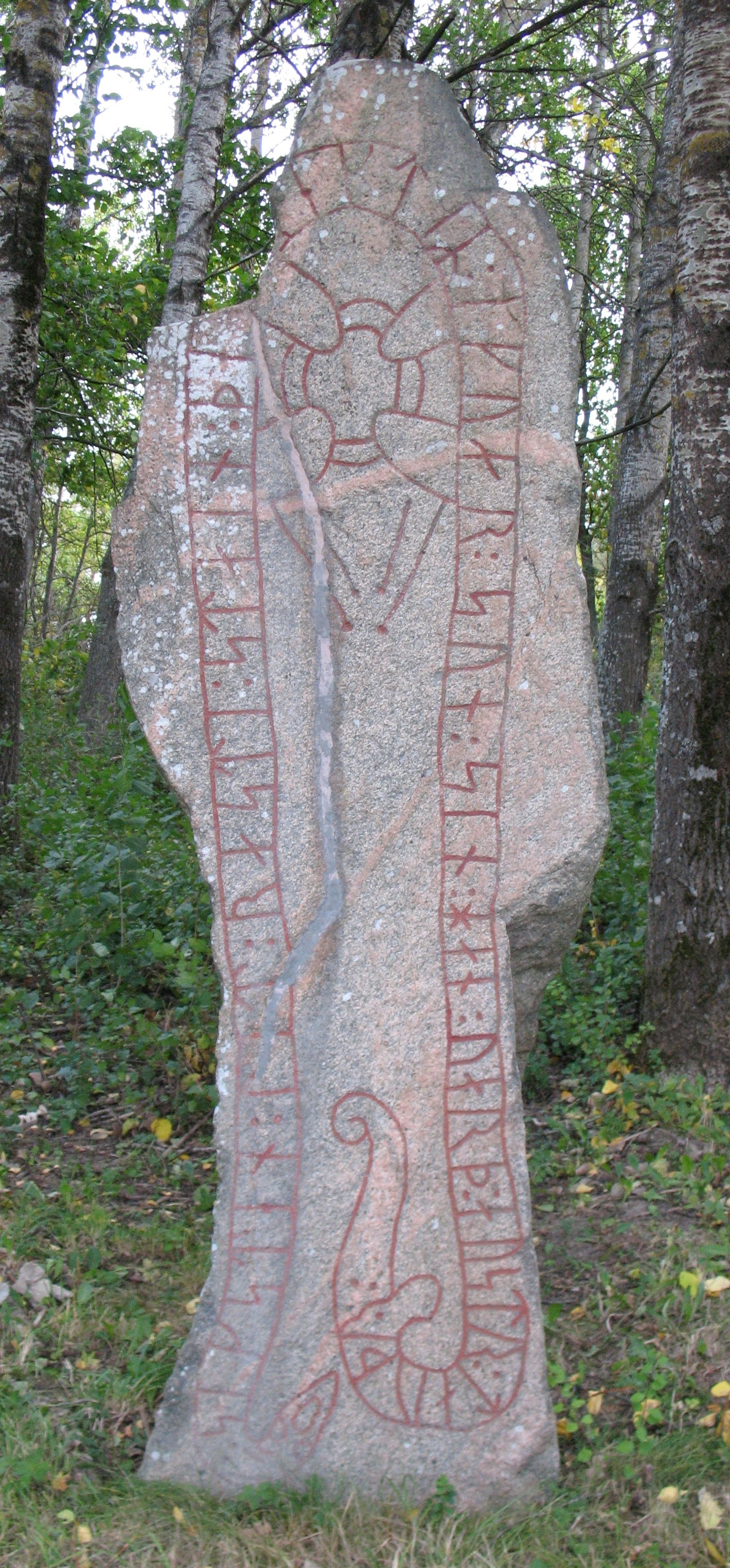
Runestone Ög 30

This runestone is found at Skjorstad. It is in the style Fp and it was raised in memory of a man named Ingvarr who died in the East.

The inscription reads:

: siksten : let : rasti : stain : þe(n)... : eftiʀ : ikuar : sun : sin : han : uarþ : austr : tauþr :
{} Sigstæinn {} let {} ræisa {} stæin {} þenn[a] {} æftiʀ {} Ingvar, {} sun {} sinn. {} Hann {} varð {} austr {} dauðr. {}
Sigsteinn had this stone raised in memory of Ingvarr, his son. He died in the east.

=== Västergötland ===
==== Vg 135 ====
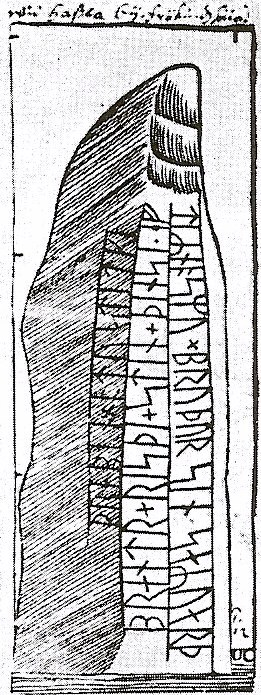
Runestone Vg 135

This runestone has disappeared but was found in the village of Hassla. It was in the style RAK and it was raised in memory of a brother who died on the eastern route.

The inscription reads:

[brantr + risþi + stin + þinsi · eftiʀ nosmu × bruþur sin · saʀ uarþ þrebin × o tustitki]
Brandr {} ræisti {} stæin {} þennsi {} æftiʀ Asmund(?), {} broður sinn. {} Saʀ varð drepinn {} a austrvegi(?).
Brandr raised this stone in memory of Ásmundr(?), his brother; he was killed on the eastern route(?).

==== Vg 184 ====
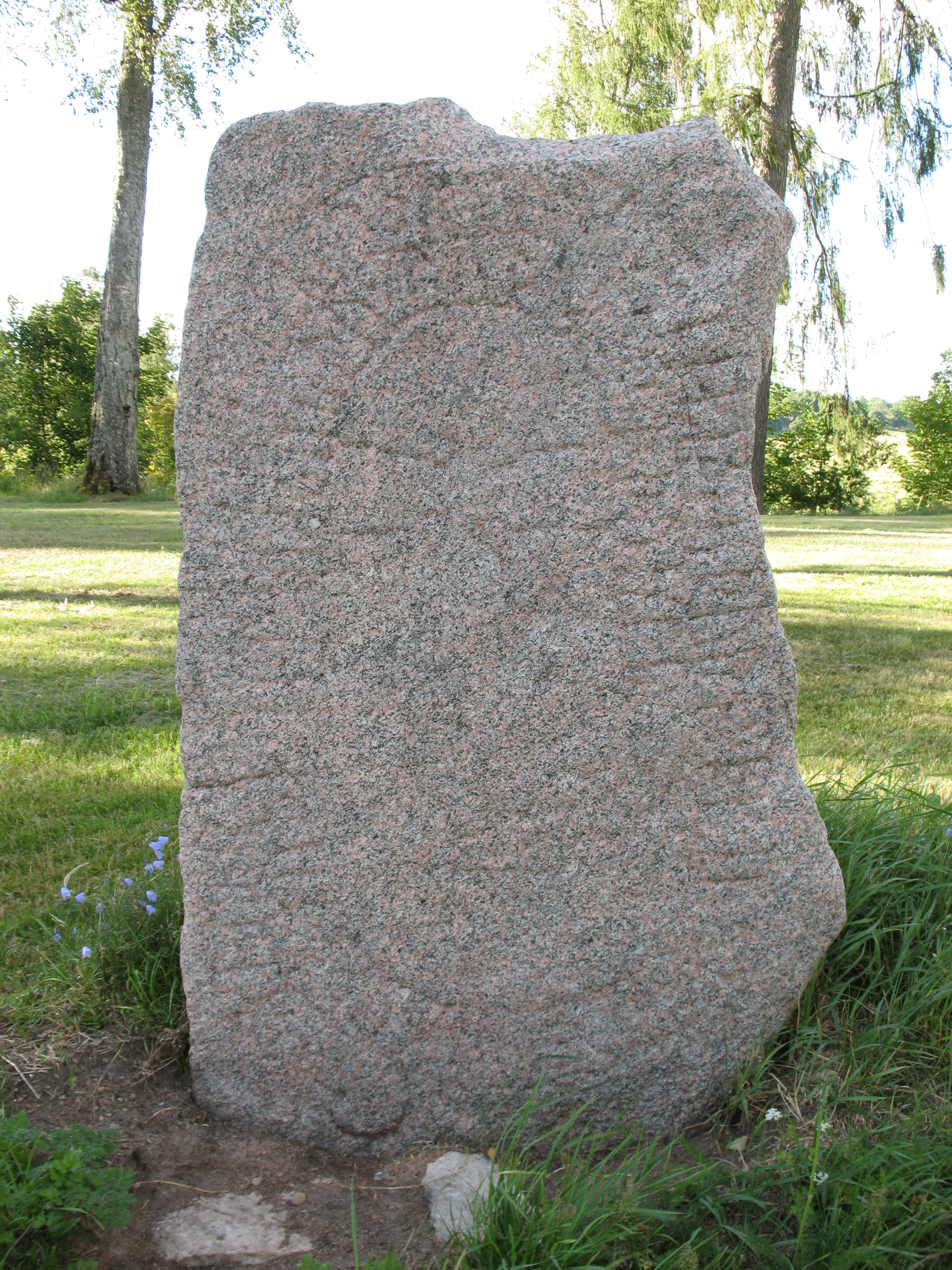
Runestone Vg 184

This runestone was raised in the cemetery of the church of Smula, but has been moved to the grounds of Dagsnäs Castle. It is carved in the style Fp and it is raised in memory of a brother who died as a warrior in the east. He may have been a member of the Varangian Guard.

The inscription reads:

: kuli : rsþi : stin : þesi : eftiʀ : rþr : kunu : sinaʀ : esburn : ok : iula : treka : hrþa : kuþa : ian : þiʀ : urþu : tuþiʀ : i : lþi : ustr :
{} Gulli/Kolli {} ræisti {} stæin {} þennsi {} æftiʀ {} brøðr {} konu {} sinnaʀ, {} Æsbiorn {} ok {} Iula, {} drængia {} harða {} goða. {} En {} þæiʀ {} urðu {} dauðiʀ {} i {} liði {} austr. {}
Gulli/Kolli raised this stone in memory of his wife's brothers Ásbjǫrn and Juli, very good valiant men. And they died in the east in the retinue.

==== Vg 197 ====
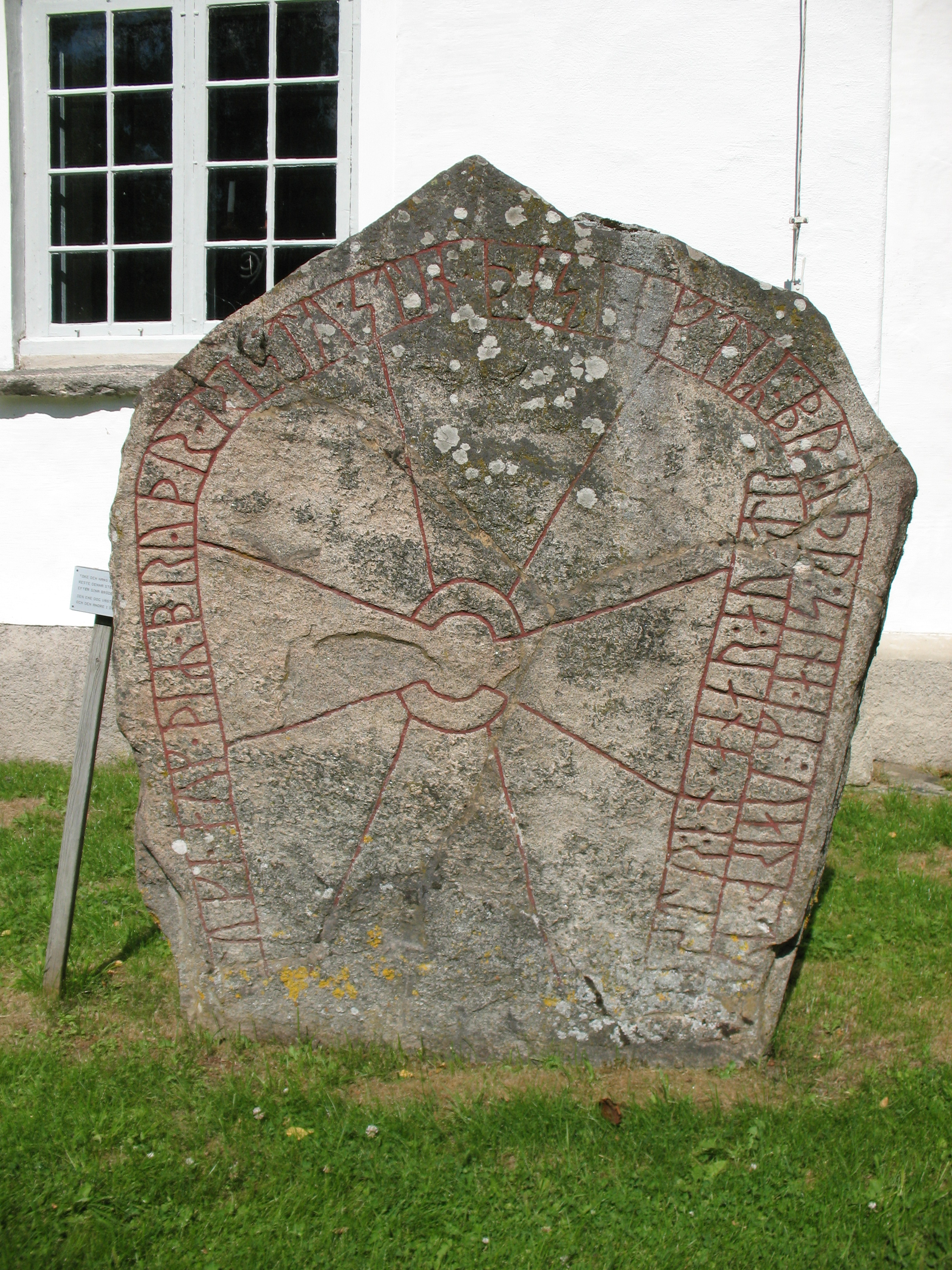
Runestone Vg 197

This runestone is raised on the cemetery of the church of Dalum. It was raised in memory of a two brothers, one of whom died in the west while the other one died in the east.

The inscription reads:

tuki · auk · þiʀ · bryþr · ristu · stin · þesi · eftiʀ : bryþr : sina · eʀ : uarþ · tu(þ)r uestr : en · anar : au(s)tr :
Toki {} ok {} þæiʀ {} brøðr {} ræistu {} stæin {} þennsi {} æftiʀ {} brøðr {} sina. {} Eʀ {} varð {} dauðr vestr, {} en {} annarr {} austr. {}
Tóki and his brothers raised this stone in memory of their brothers. One died in the west, another in the east.

=== Öland ===
==== Öl 28 (58) ====
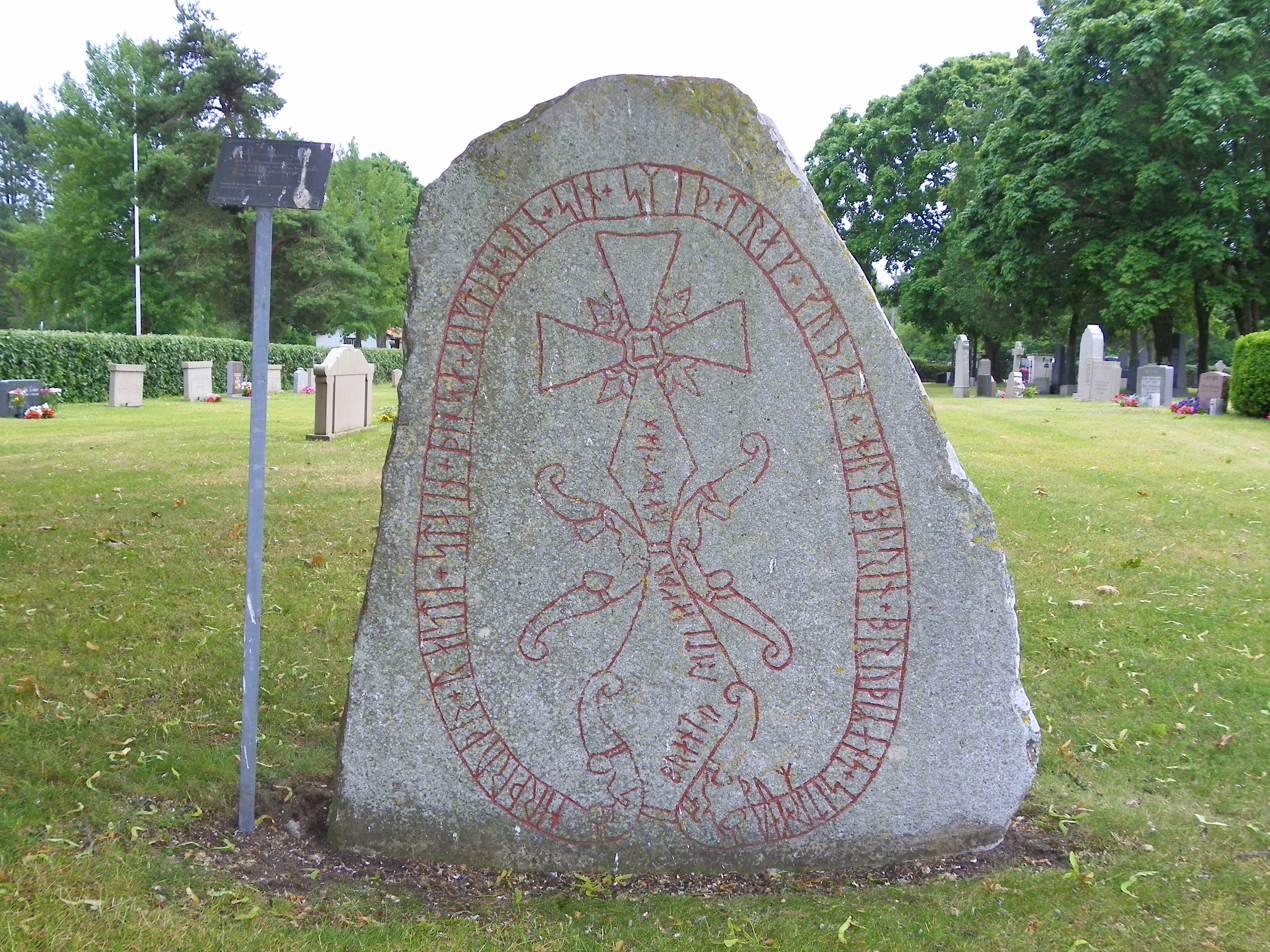
Runestone Öl 28

This runestone is raised on the cemetery of Gårdby and it is raised in memory of a man who either stayed in what is today Russia or in a nearby location. It is dated to the period 1020–1050.

The inscription reads:

harþruþr + raisti + stain + þinsa + aiftiʀ + sun + sin + s(m)iþ + trak + kuþan + halfburin + bruþiʀ ans + sitr + kar¶þum ¶ brantr + rit- × iak þu raþa + khn
Hærþruðr {} ræisti {} stæin {} þennsa {} æftiʀ {} sun {} sinn {} Smið, {} dræng {} goðan. {} Halfborinn, {} broðiʀ hans, {} sitr {} Garðum. {} Brandr {} rett {} hiogg, þy raða {} kann.
Herþrúðr raised this stone in memory of her son Smiðr, a good valiant man. Halfborinn, his brother, sits in Garðar (Russia). Brandr cut rightly, for whoever can interpret (the runes).

harþruþr + raisti + stain + þinsa + aiftiʀ + sun + sin + s(m)iþ + trak + kuþan + halfburin + bruþiʀ ans + sitr + kar¶þum ¶ brantr + rit - × iak þu raþa + khn
Hærþruðr {} ræisti {} stæin {} þennsa {} æftiʀ {} sun {} sinn {} Smið, {} dræng {} goðan. {} Halfborinn, {} broðiʀ hans, {} sitr {} Garðum {} Brandr. {} Rett [i] {} hiogg, þy raða {} kann.
Herþrúðr raised this stone in memory of her son Smiðr, a good valiant man. His halfbrother Brandr sits in Garðir. Cut rightly into, for whoever can interpret (the runes).

=== Gotland ===
There are only about ten runestones on Gotland that commemorate men who died in foreign lands, which appears to challenge the common view that the island was "the international trade center of the Viking Age". Four of these runestones mention East European place names.

==== G 114 ====
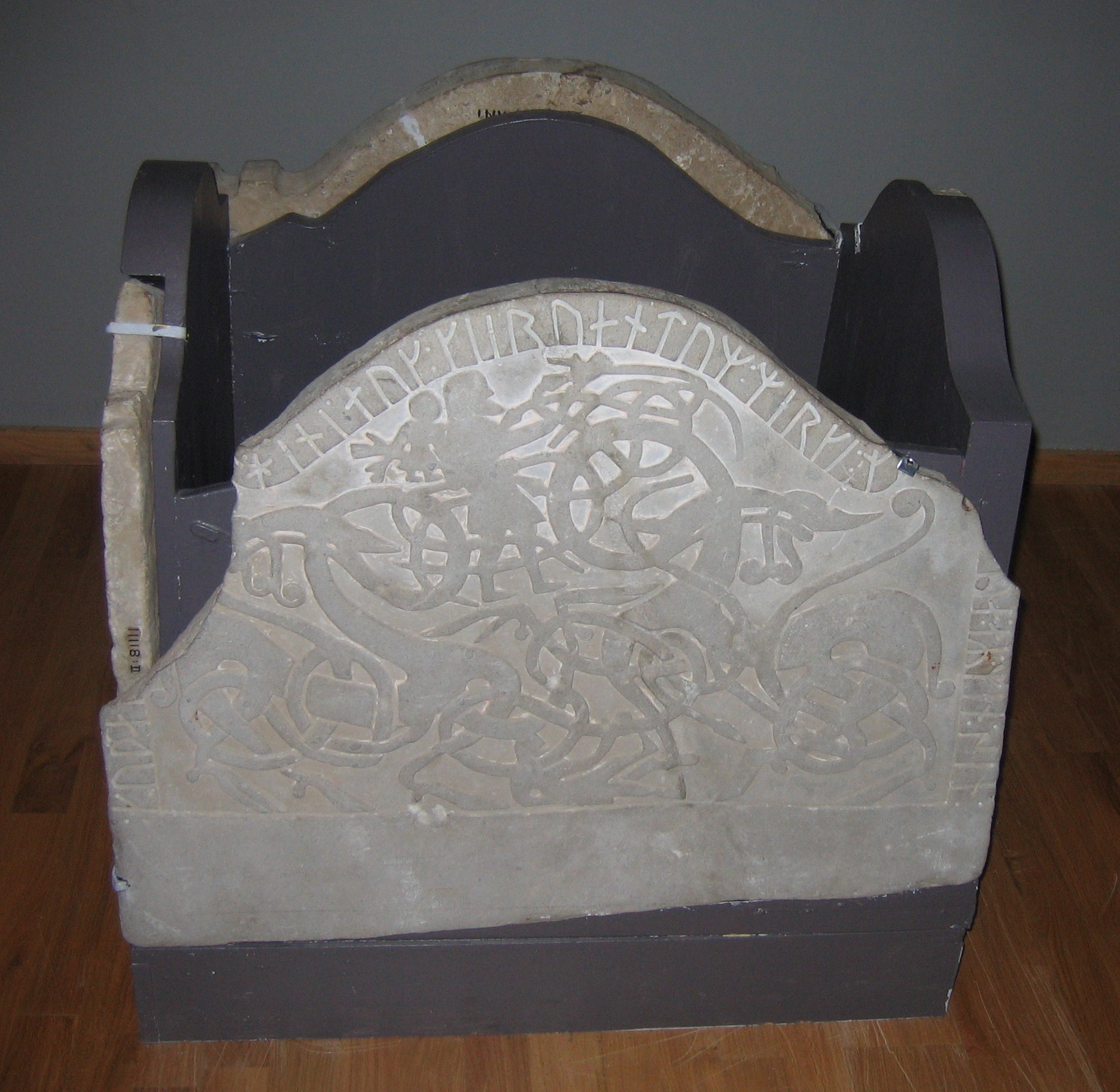
Runestone G 114, side C

This runestone refers to a man who was in a place called karþum. One view holds that the place name is Garðar, i.e. Garðaríki (the lands of Rus'), and another view is that the name refers to Garda Parish not far from the stone. Omeljan Pritsak holds the first view to be the correct one, since having been to a neighbouring parish hardly merits a mention on a runestone. It is probably from the first half of the 11th century.

The inscription reads:

: syniʀ : likna(t)(a)- ... ...(a)rua : merki : kut : ebtir : ailikni : kunu : koþa : moþur :
{} Syniʀ {} Liknhvata[ʀ] ... [g]ærva {} mærki {} gott {} æftiʀ {} Æilikni, {} konu {} goða, {} moður {}
The sons of Líknhvatr ... the good landmark made in memory of Eilíkn, a good wife, mother ...

...(s) : auk : kaiʀuataʀ : auk : liknuiaʀ :
... {} ok {} Gæiʀhvataʀ {} ok {} Liknviaʀ. {}
and Geirhvatr and Líknvé.

: kuþ a-... ... ...(n) : heni : auk : kieruantum : merki : m-... ...ua : aʀ : men : sin :
{} Guð o[k](?) ... [naði]n(?) {} hænni {} ok {} gærvandum {} mærki {} ... ... {} eʀ {} mænn {} sen {}
God ... be gracious to her and those making the landmark ... who men

...(ʀ) : i : karþum : aʀ : uaʀ : ui(u)(e) meʀ :: (h)...
... {} i {} Garðum/Garde, {} eʀ {} vaʀ {} Vivi(?) meðr {} ...
... in Garðir/Garde, he was with Vivi(?) ... ...

==== G 134 ====
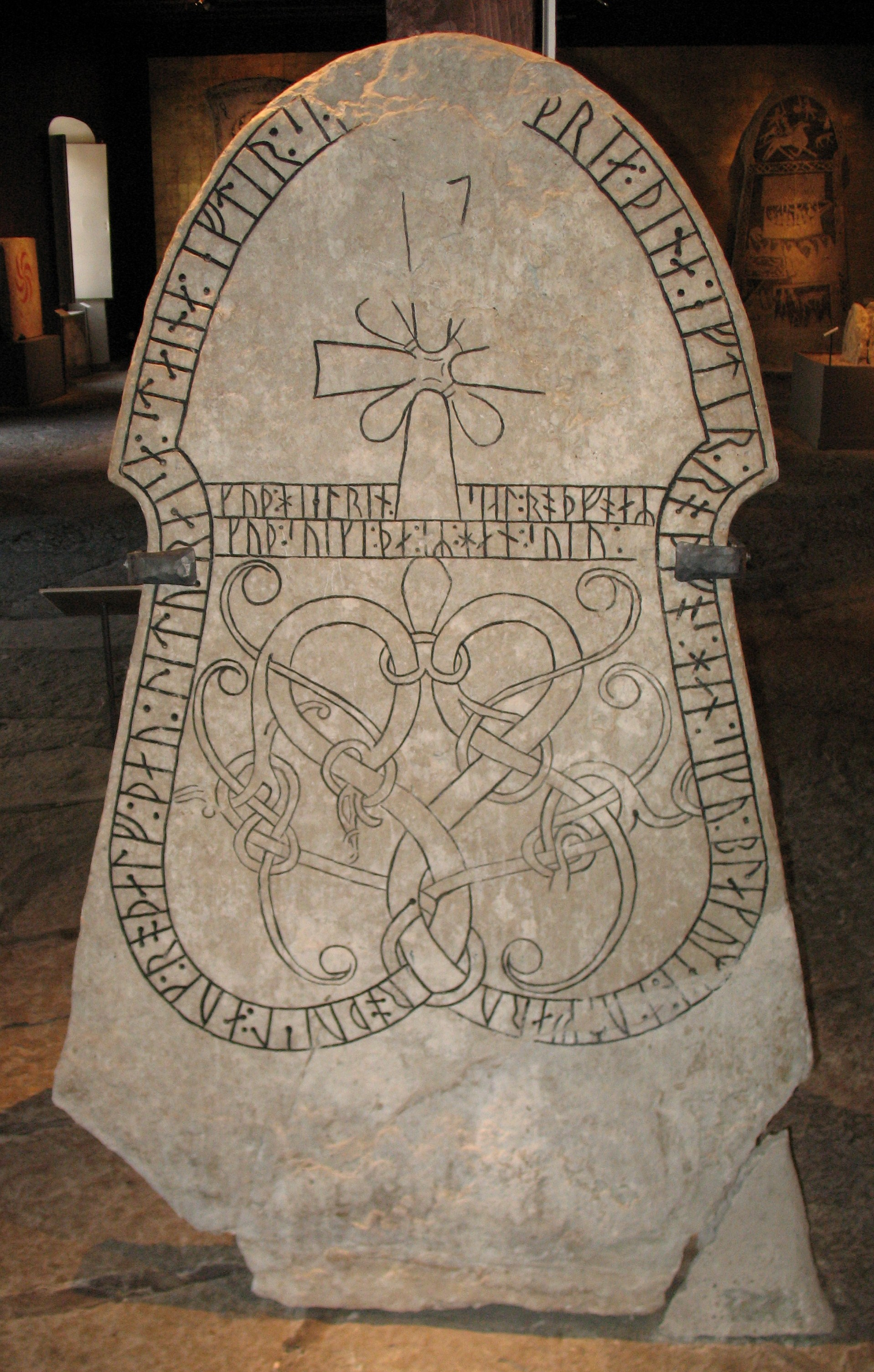
Runestone G 134

The stones G 134 and G 135 tell about the same family, and there is also an additional runestone about the same people, G 136. These runestones tell of a common situation for Scandinavian families in the 11th century: one son was killed through treason in the South, possibly as a member of the Varangian Guard, and another son died in Vindau (Ventspils, Latvia).

The men who betrayed Hróðfúss were according to the runestone blökumenn ('black men') and most scholars interpret them as Walachians, but others, such as Omeljan Pritsak, argue in favour of a theory that they were Polovtsians. This theory was proposed in 1929 by Akeksej I. Sobolevskij, and he suggested that blökumenn was connected to a Central European name for the Kipchak (Qipčaq) Polovcians (Qūmans), which was Blawen, Blauen and a translation of the Slavic Plavci. All the Old Norse information on the blökumenn date to the period 1016–1017 in the case of Eymundar þáttr and to 1122 concerning the Berroa battle (Saint Olaf's miracles), but the first mention of the Wallachians is in Niketas Choniates' Chronikē diēgesis and it concerns an event in 1164. Moreover, Pritsak notes that ON blakkr also had the meaning 'pale' which designated the first ruling horde of the Kipchaks who were one of the most important nomadic peoples in the 11th and 12th centuries.

The inscription reads:

roþuisl : auk : roþalf : þau : litu : raisa : staina : eftir : sy-... ... þria : þina : eftir : roþfos : han : siku : blakumen : i : utfaru kuþ : hialbin : sial : roþfoaʀ kuþ : suiki : þa : aʀ : han : suiu :
Hroðvisl {} ok {} Hroðælfʀ {} þaun {} letu {} ræisa {} stæina {} æftiʀ {} sy[ni sina] þria. {} Þenna {} æftiʀ {} Hroðfoss. {} Hann {} sviku {} blakumenn {} i {} utfaru. Guð {} hialpin {} sial {} Hroðfosaʀ. Guð {} sviki {} þa, {} eʀ {} hann {} sviku. {}
Hróðvísl and Hróðelfr, they had the stones raised in memory of (their) three sons. This (one) in memory of Hróðfúss. Wallachians betrayed him on a voyage. May God help Hróðfúss' soul. May God betray those who betrayed him.

==== G 220 ====
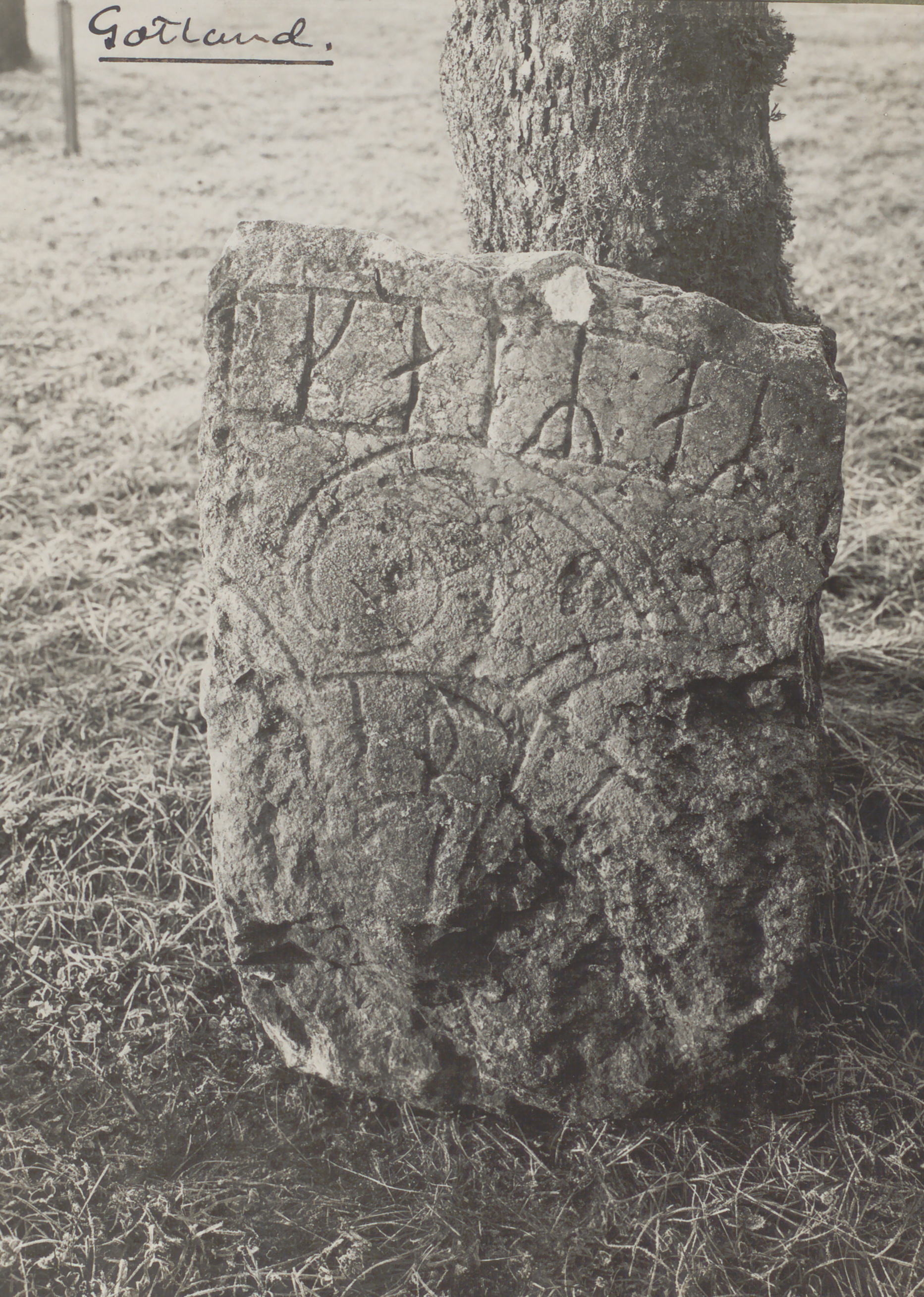

This runestone is found in a museum in Gotland. It is a fragment of a runestone made of limestone and it was made in memory of a man who died in Novgorod. The inscription testifies to the intense contacts that existed between Gotland and Novgorod, where the Gotlanders had a trading station of their own.

The inscription reads:

... ...tkaiʀ : aʀ : to i : hulmka-... ...iþ(i) : -...
... [U]ddgæiʀ/[Bo]tgæiʀ. {} Eʀ {} do i {} Holmga[rði] ... {} ...
... Oddgeirr/Bótgeirr. He died in Holmgarðir ...

==== G 280 ====
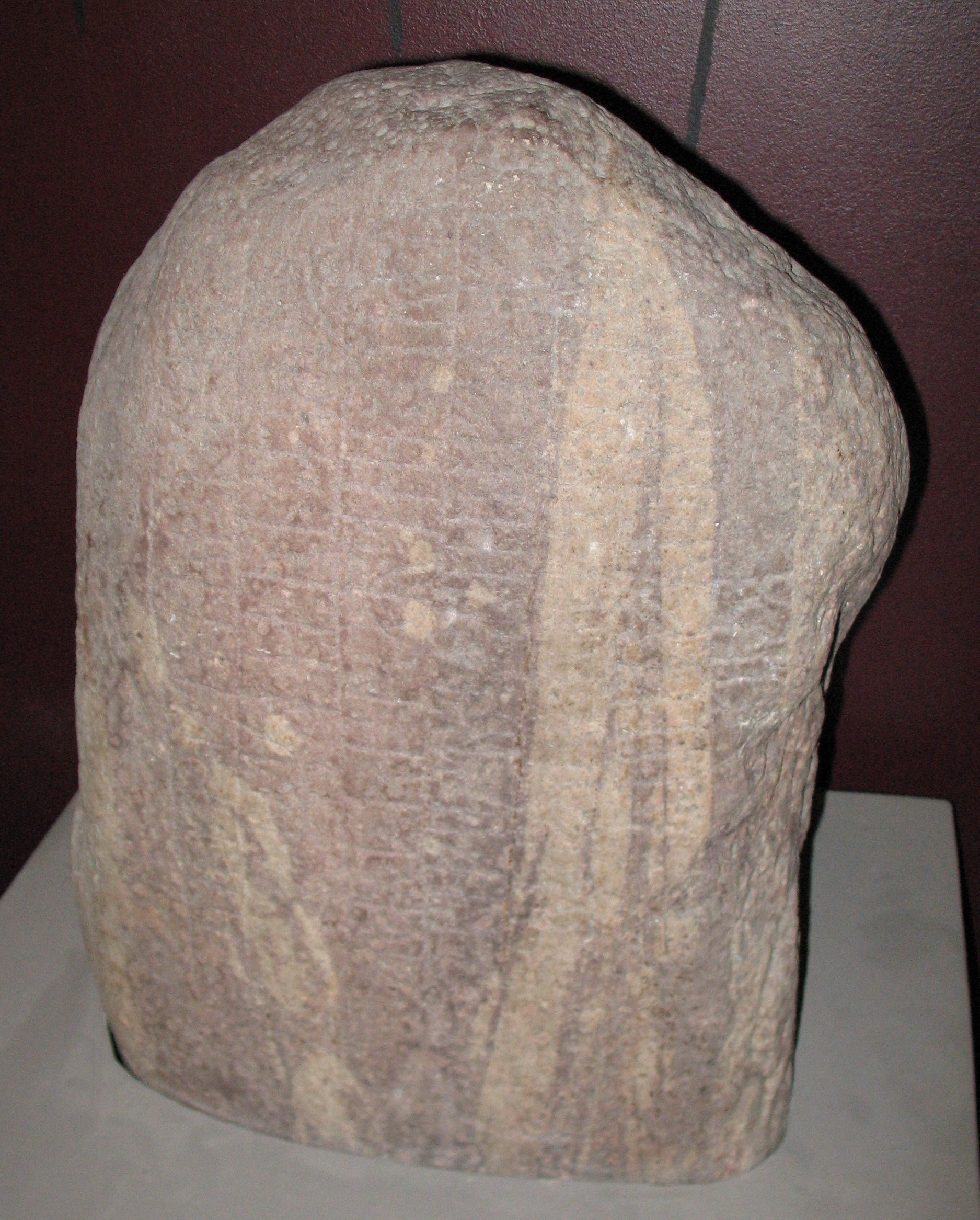
Runestone G 280

This runestone was found in Pilgårds, but is now located in a museum on Gotland. It was dated to the last half of the 10th century by Wolfgang Krause. The runestone was raised in memory of men led by Vífil who navigated the Dniepr cataracts, and tried to pass the most dangerous of them, the Nenasytec', the άειφόρ of Constantine Porphyrogenitus (Eifor). When they arrived at Rvanyj Kamin' (Rufstain), Rafn was killed and the crew raised stones in his memory south of it.

The inscription reads:

biarfaa : statu : sis[o] stain ¶ hakbiarn : bruþr ¶ ruþuisl : austain : imuar ¶ is af[a] : st[ai]n[a] : stata : aft : raf[a] ¶ su[þ] furi : ru[f]staini : kuamu ¶ uit i aifur : uifil ¶ [ba]uþ [u^m]
Biartfann {} staddu {} þenna(?) stæin {} Hægbiorn [ok] brøðr [hans] Roðvisl, {} Øystæinn, {} <-muar>, {} es hafa {} stæina {} stadda {} aft {} Rafn {} suðr fyriʀ {} Rufstæini. {} Kvamu {} vitt i Æifur. {} Vifill {} bauð ...
Hegbjǫrn raised this stone glaring (and his) brothers Hróðvísl, Eysteinn, <-muar>, who have had stones raised in memory of Hrafn south of Rofstein. They came far and wide in Eifor. Vífill bade ...

== Denmark ==
=== DR 108 ===
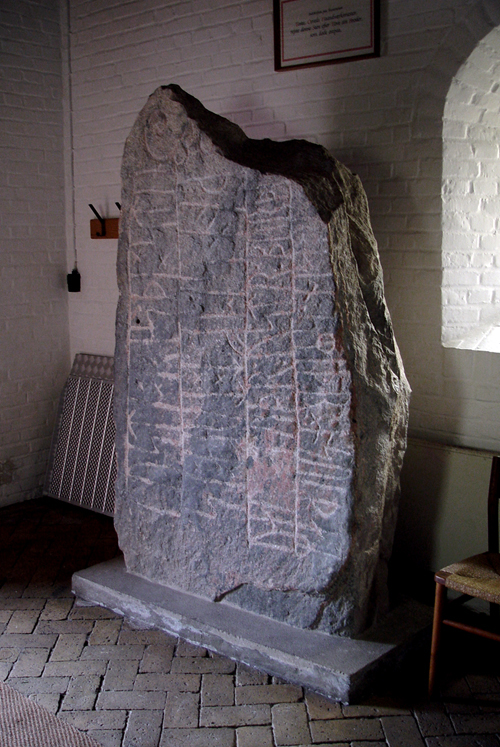
Runestone DR 108

This runestone is found in Kolind in Syddjurs Municipality, Denmark. It is in style RAK and it was raised in memory of a brother who died in the east.

The inscription reads:

tusti ⁑ risþi ⁑ stin ¶ þonsi ⁑ ift ⁑ tufa ⁑ is ¶ uarþ (:) tuþr : ustr : burþu¶r ⁑ sin ⁑ smiþr ⁑ osuiþaʀ
Tosti {} resþi {} sten {} þænsi {} æft {} Tofa, {} æs {} warþ {} døþr {} østr, {} broþur {} sin, {} smiþr {} Aswiþaʀ.
Tosti, Ásviðr's smith, raised this stone in memory of Tófi, his brother, who died in the east.

== Norway ==
=== N 62 ===
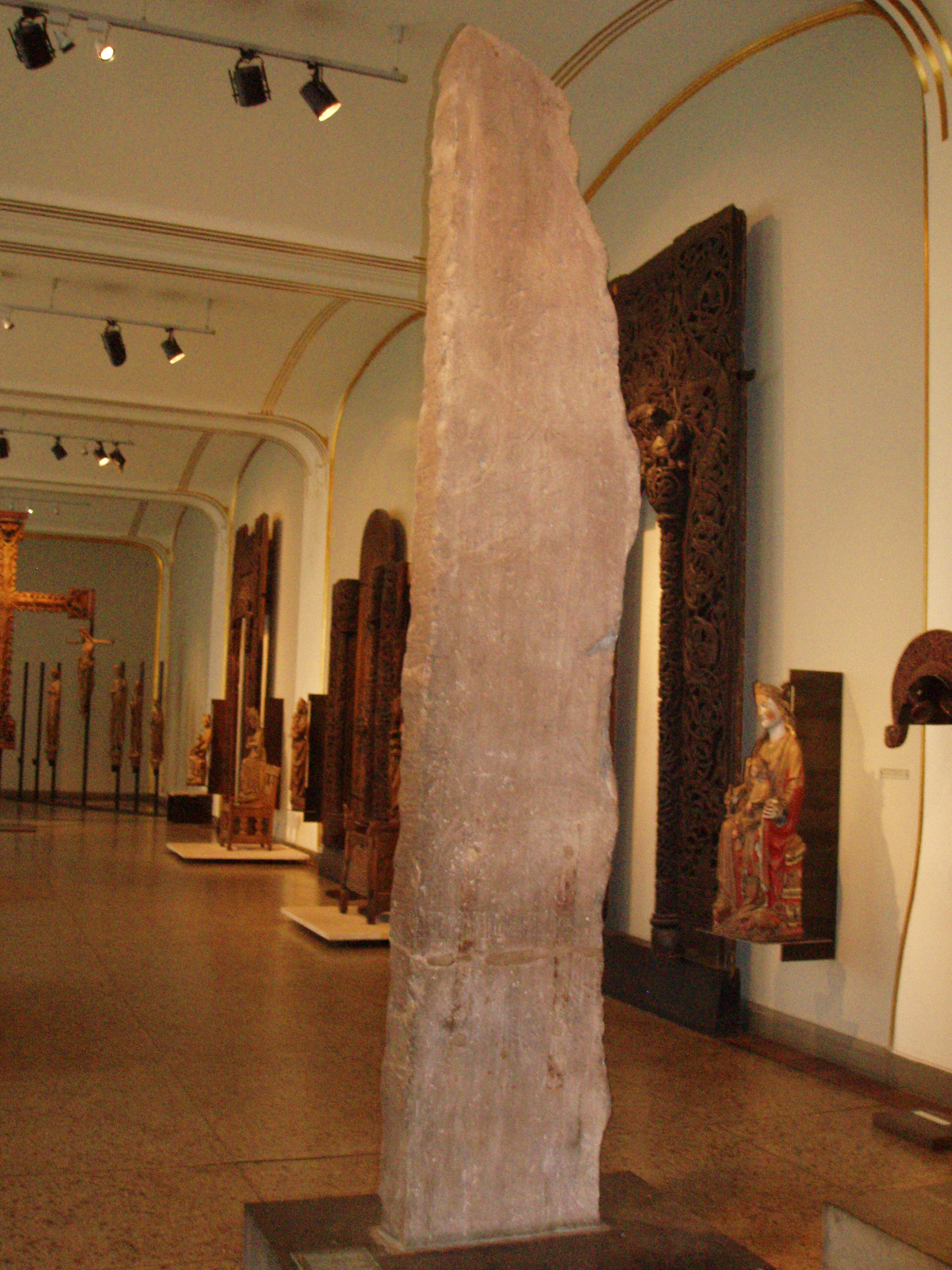
The Alstad runestone with the inscriptions N 61 and 62

This runic inscription is found on the same stone as N 61, and they tell of the same clan. Bjørn Hougen dated N 61 to 1000-1030 and Magnus Olsen dated N 62 to the 1060s. It is in short-twig runes.

It relates of a man who died in a location in Eastern Europe, and there has been some scholarly debate on exactly where. Olsen read the location as Vitaholmi, miðli Vitaholms ok Garða ('Vitaholm, between Vitaholm and Garðar'), but in 1933, Lis Jacobsen suggested that the second toponym was ustaulm. In 1961, an archaeological excavation in Vitičev, near Kiev, by B. A. Rybakov and Boris Kleiber, provided a solution. They discovered a beacon which had given fire signals to Kiev, and in Old Norse such a beacon was called a viti. The name Vitičev has no Slavic etymology, and so Kleiber suggested that its original name was Vitičev xolm, i.e. Vitaholmi. The name Vitičev would originally have been Vitiča, a suffixed borrowing of viti. Kleiber analysed the first part of the second Vitaholmi as usta, a genitive of an *usti which would have been how the Norse rendered the Slavic toponym Ustja (Zarub). Ustja was located on a hill near a ford across the Trubež, a tributary of the Dniepr. According to Kleiber, Garða is a shortened form of Kœnugarðar, the Old Norse name for Kiev. This solution reads the location of Þóraldr's death as "in Vitičev between Ustja and Kiev".

According to Judith Jesch, Vitaholm may be related either to Witland, a historical region on the east side of the River Vistula, or to Vindau on the coast of Courland.

Kleiber suggests that Engli was a member of Eymund's warband which fought in the lands of Rus' during the first half of the 11th century.

The inscription reads:

× ikli × reisti stein þana eftir × þoral(t)... sun sin is uarþ tauþr × i uitahol(m)(i) miþli ustaulms auk karþa ×
{} Engli {} reisti stein þenna eptir {} Þórald, son sinn, er varð dauðr {} í Vitaholmi, miðli Ustaholms ok Garða. {}
Engli raised this stone in memory of Þóraldr, his son, who died in Vitaholmr - between Ustaholmr and Garðar (Russia).

== See also ==
- Berezan' Runestone
- List of runestones
- Trade route from the Varangians to the Greeks

== General References ==
- Larsson, Mats G. (2002). Götarnas riken: upptäcktsfärder till Sveriges enande (in Swedish). Stockholm: Atlantis. ISBN 9789174866414.
- Peterson, Lena (2002). "Nordisk Runnamnslexikon" (in Swedish). Swedish Institute for Linguistics and Heritage (Institutet för språk och folkminnen). Archived from the original on 2011-02-25.
- "Samnordisk runtextdatabas". Uppsala University, Department of Scandinavian Languages (in Swedish and English).
