= Clisby =

Clisby is a surname. Notable people with the surname include:

- Harriet Clisby (1830–1931), English physician and activist
- Jack Clisby (born 1992), Australian soccer player
- Les Clisby (1914–1940), Australian fighter ace of World War II
- Mark Clisby, Australian lawyer, author, journalist and military historian
- Mitch Clisby (born 1990), Australian rules footballer

== See also ==
- Clasby, surname
- Cleasby, village in North Yorkshire
