= Cleasby (surname) =

Cleasby is an English surname. Notable people with the surname include:

- Anthony Cleasby (1804–1879), English judge
- Ingram Cleasby (1920–2009), English churchman
- Richard Cleasby (1779–1847), English philologist

== See also ==
- Clasby
