= Ingvar runestones =

Group of Norse runestones

Clickable map of the geographic distribution of the Ingvar Runestones in southern Sweden (modern administrative borders and cities are shown)

The Ingvar runestones (Swedish: Ingvarstenarna) is the name of around 26 Varangian Runestones that were raised in commemoration of those who died in the Swedish Viking expedition to the Caspian Sea of Ingvar the Far-Travelled.

The Ingvar expedition was the single Swedish event that is mentioned on most runestones, and in number, they are only surpassed by the approximately 30 Greece Runestones and the approximately 30 England Runestones. It was a fateful expedition taking place between 1036 and 1041 with many ships. The Vikings came to the south-eastern shores of the Caspian Sea, and they appear to have taken part in the Battle of Sasireti, in Georgia. Few returned, as many died in battle, but most of them, including Ingvar, died of disease.

The expedition was also immortalized as a saga in Iceland in the 11th century, the Yngvars saga víðförla, and in the Georgian chronicle Kartlis tskhovreba, where king Julfr of the saga corresponds to king Baghrat IV.

Beside the Tillinge Runestone in Uppland and a rune stone on Gotland, the Ingvar Runestones are the only remaining runic inscriptions that mention Serkland. Below follows a presentation of the runestones, but additional runestones that are associated with the expedition are: Sö 360, U 513, U 540, U 785, Vs 1-2, Vs 18 and Vg 184. The nine runestones that mention Serkland can also be grouped as a runestone group of their own, in line with the same guidelines that apply to runestone groups such as the Ingvar Runestones and the England Runestones.

The transcriptions into Old Norse are in the Swedish and Danish dialect to facilitate comparison with the inscriptions, while the English translation provided by Rundata gives the names in the de facto standard dialect (the Icelandic and Norwegian dialect):

== Uppland ==
=== U 439 ===
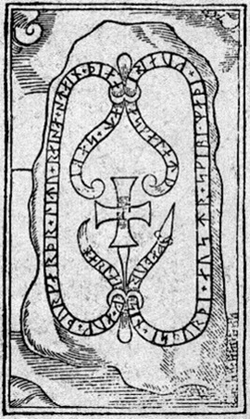
Runestone U 439

This runestone in runestone style Fp and is one of the Serkland runestones. It was located at Steninge Palace, but it is now lost. Johan Bureus, one of the first prominent Swedish runologists, visited Steninge on May 8, 1595, and made a drawing of the runestone which stood by the jetty. Only 50 years later it had disappeared and in a letter written in 1645 it was explained that the stone had been used in the construction of a new stone jetty.

The inscription contained an Old Norse poem. Of the names in the text, Sæbiorn means "sea bear," Hærlæif means "warrior love relic" or "beloved warrior," and Þorgærðr is the name of a goddess, Þorgerðr, which combines the god name Thor and gerðr, the latter word meaning "fenced in." (Cf. also the name of the Giantess Gerðr.) Ingvar, the leader of the expedition, has a name meaning "the god Ing's warrior." This runestone is attributed to the runemaster Äskil.

[harlaif × auk × þurkarþr × litu × raisa × stain × þina at × sabi faþur sin × is| |sturþi × austr × skibi × maþ ikuari a/a| |askalat-/skalat-]
Hærlæif {} ok {} Þorgærðr {} lētu {} ræisa {} stæin {} þenna at {} Sæbiorn, faður sinn. {} Es stȳrði {} austr {} skipi {} með Ingvari ą̄ Æistaland(?)/Særkland[i](?).
"Herleif and Þorgerðr had this stone raised in memory of Sæbjǫrn, their father, who steered a ship east with Ingvarr to Estonia(?)/Serkland(?)."

=== U 644 ===
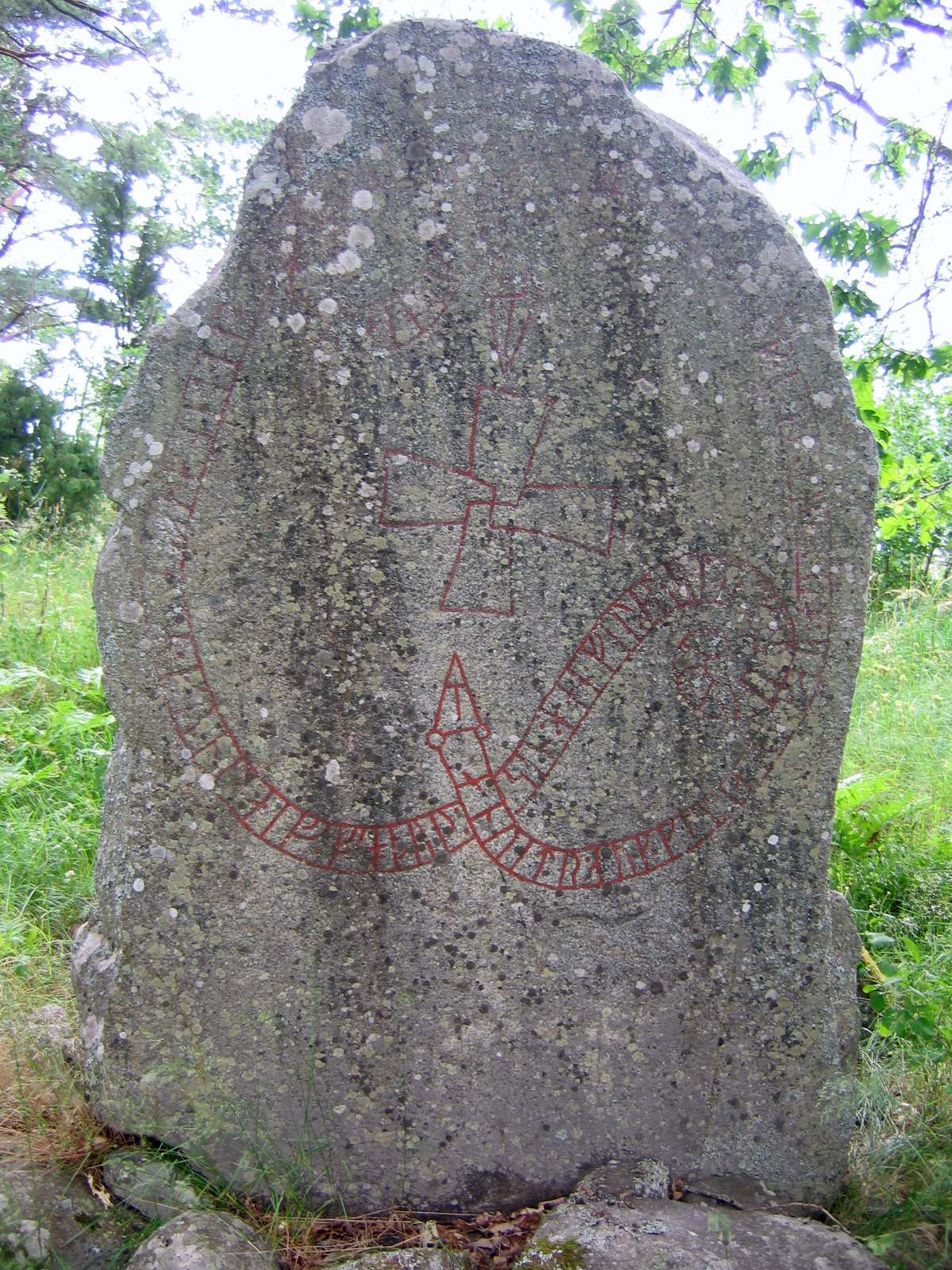
Runestone U 644

This runestone in style Fp is located at Ekilla bro. It is raised in memory of the same man as U 654, below. The same family also raised the runestone U 643 and which reports the death of Andvéttr. Omeljan Pritsak suggests that he may have died in Vladimir of Novgorod's attack on Constantinople in 1043.

The monument is more than 2 metres high, and it was mentioned for the first time in the 17th century during the national revision of historic monuments. It was at the time lying under the stone bridge that crossed the river north of Ekilla. It would remain lying there until 1860, when it was moved with great difficulty by Richard Dybeck. After one failed attempt a crew of 12 men managed to move it out of the water and raise it 25 metres north of the bridge, where it still remains. Next to it, there are two barrows and a monument of raised stones. There were formerly two other runestones at the bridge, but they were moved to Ekolsund in the early 19th century. One of them speaks of the same family as U 644, and it is raised after Andvéttr and his sons Gunnleifr and Kárr (one of the sons has the same name as his grandfather and the other one has the same name as his uncle).

The inscription is finished with a Christian prayer, which shows that the family was Christian. It is of note that andinni ("the spirit") is in the definite form, as this is a grammatical category that does not appear in Old Norse until the end of the Viking Age. It would remain rare even in the medieval Swedish provincial laws. The same form was used on a lost runestone in the vicinity, which, however, was not made by the same runemaster, which suggests that there were two runemasters in the region using the same linguistic innovation.

an(u)(i)(t)r : auk · kiti : auk · kar : auk · blisi · auk · tiarfr · þir · raistu · stain þina · aftiʀ · kunlaif · foþur : sin han : fil · austr : miþ : ikuari kuþ heabi ąntini
Andvēttr {} ok {} <kiti> {} ok {} Kārr {} ok {} Blesi {} ok {} Diarfʀ {} þæiʀ {} ræistu {} stæin þenna {} æftiʀ {} Gunnlæif, {} faður {} sinn. Hann {} fell {} austr {} með {} Ingvari. Guð hialpi andinni.
"Andvéttr and <kiti> and Kárr and Blesi and Djarfr, they raised this stone in memory of Gunnleifr, their father. He fell in the east with Ingvarr. May God help (his) spirit."

=== U 654 ===
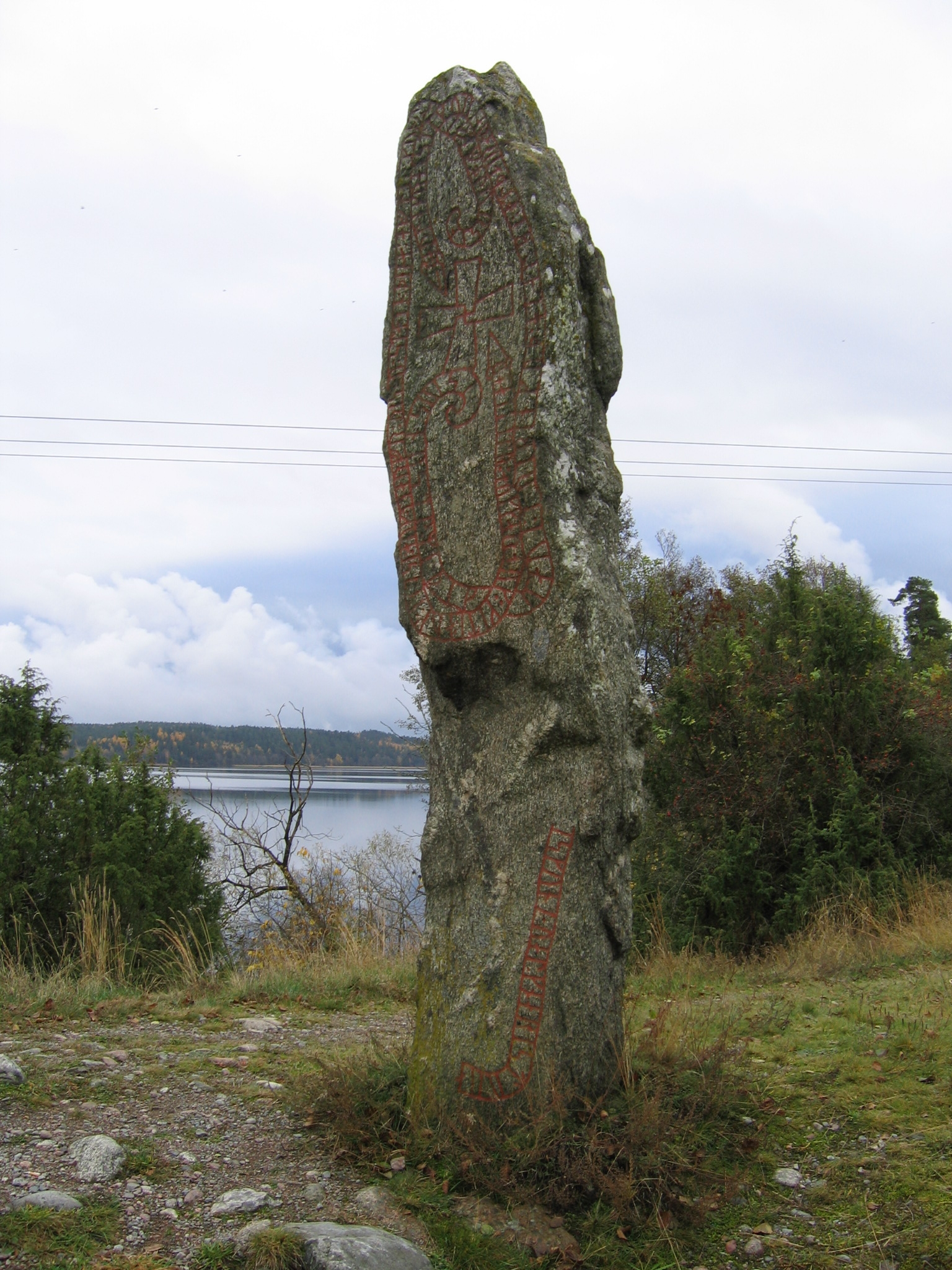
Runestone U 654

The Varpsund runestone is in style Fp. It is almost three metres tall, and it is located on a promontory between Stora Ullfjärden ("Great fjard of Ullr") and Ryssviken ("Bay of the Russians") so as to be well visible for both those travelling on land and those travelling by water. It contains an Old Norse poem.

The runestone was depicted as early as 1599 by Johannes Bureus, and in the 17th century on a drawing by Johan Hadorph and Johan Leitz. Unfortunately, the names of two of the brothers who are mentioned on the stone were already lost at that time. Luckily, the brothers raised a second stone (U 644, above) at Ekilla Bro a few kilometres to the south of Varpsund, which is why scholars are certain that their names were Andvéttr and Blesi.

The runemaster's name is partially superficially carved and the last rune has disappeared, but it was probably Alrikr. It is a characteristic of this runemaster that the r-rune is used where the R-rune should be. Moreover, the u-rune is probably used on this stone for an u-umlauted a. These are dialect traits typical of the Old Norse dialect of Iceland and Norway (Old West Norse).

The inscription mentions the knarr, which was a larger seagoing trading vessel with ample cargo space. The knarr is mentioned in five other Viking Age runestones, two in Södermanland and three in Uppland. A sixth inscription is found in the medieval church of Sakshaug in the fjord of Trondheim, Norway, where someone has carved the image of a knarr and written in runes "there was a knarr outside".

The same family also raised the runestone U 643 and which reports the death of Andvéttr. Omeljan Pritsak suggests that he may have died in Vladimir of Novgorod's attack on Constantinople in 1043.

+ a--itr : auk · ka(r) auk : kiti : auk : -[l]isi : auk · tiarfr : ris[t]u : stain : þena : aftir : kunlaif : foþur sin ¶ is u[a]s nus(t)(r) · m[i](þ) ikuari : tribin kuþ : hialbi : o(t) þaira ¶ al-ikr| |raistik · runar ¶ is kuni + ual · knari stura
{} A[ndv]ēttr {} ok {} Kārr ok {} <kiti> {} ok {} [B]lesi {} ok {} Diarfʀ {} ræistu {} stæin {} þenna {} æftiʀ {} Gunnlæif, {} faður sinn. {} Es vas austr {} með Ingvari {} drepinn. Guð {} hialpi {} and þæiʀa. {} Al[r]īkʀ(?) ræist-ek {} rūnaʀ. {} Es kunni {} væl {} knærri stȳra.
"Andvéttr and Kárr and <kiti> and Blesi and Djarfr raised this stone in memory of Gunnleifr, their father, who was killed in the east with Ingvarr. May God help their spirits. Alríkr(?), I carved the runes. He could steer a cargo-ship well."

=== U 661 ===
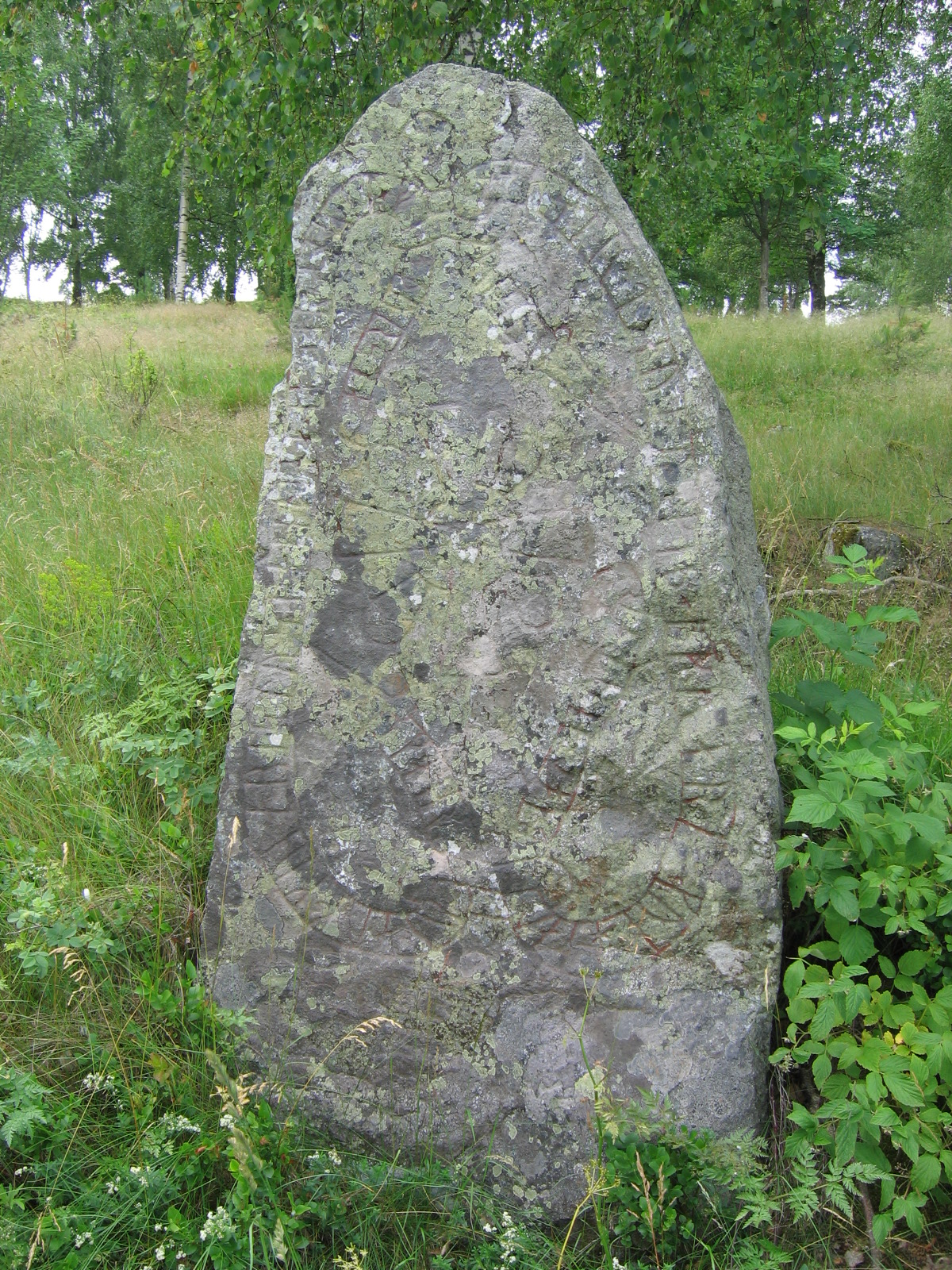
Runestone U 661

This stone is in style Fp. It is located c. 500 metres south-west of the church of Råby in a gravefield with c. 175 registered pre-historic monuments. Among these monuments, there are many raised stones, mostly in stone circles, 34 barrows and a triangular cairn. The runestone contains an Old Norse poem.

The runestone was examined in the early 17th century by Johannes Bureus and it was included in his book Monumenta Sveo-Gothica Hactenus Expulta.

The artwork of the stone is in line with many of the other Ingvar runestones, but it is debated whether they were made by the same runemaster or not. It is of note that the u-rune appears to be used for an u-umlauted a, an umlaut which existed in Sweden, but was typical of the dialect of Iceland and Norway (Old West Norse).

kairui × auk × kula × ristu × stain þina × aftir × ąnunt × fąþur sia is uas × austr × tauþr × miþ × ikuari × kuþ × hialbi ąt × ąnutar
Gæiʀvī {} ok {} Gulla {} ræistu {} stæin þenna {} æftiʀ {} Anund, {} faður sinn. Es vas {} austr {} dauðr {} með {} Ingvari. {} Guð {} hialpi and {} Anundaʀ.
"Geirvé and Gulla raised this stone in memory of Ǫnundr, their father, who died in the east with Ingvarr. May God help Ǫnundr's spirit."

=== U 778 ===
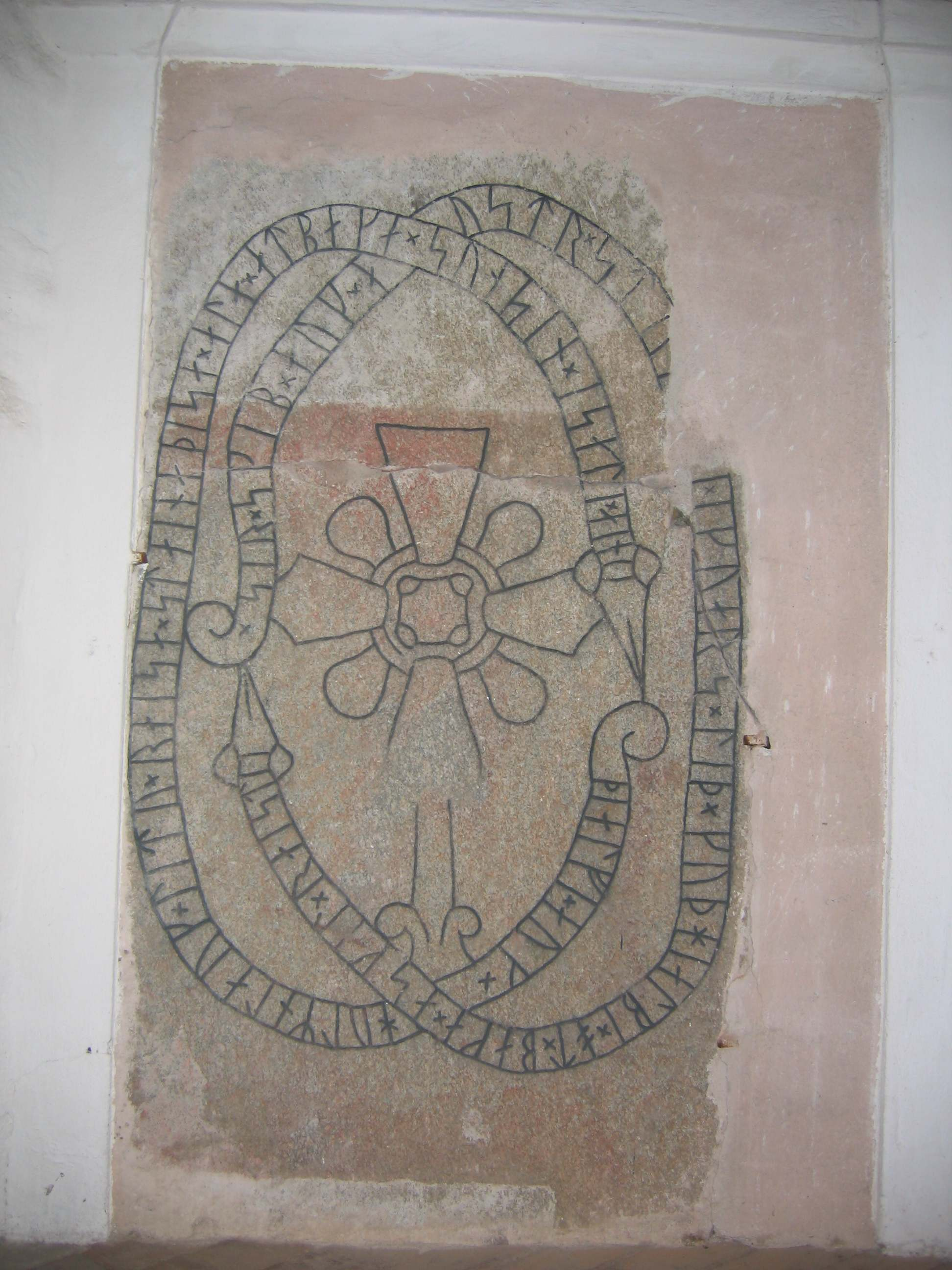
Runestone U 778

This stone is in runestone style Fp and was carved by the runemaster Áskell. It is located in the porch of the church of Svinnegarn. It contains an Old Norse poem.

The text refers to the lið of Ingvar. This word, translated by Rundata as "retinue," is often used in reference to the Þingalið, the Scandinavian forces that served the English kings from 1013–1066, and is used that way on runestone U 668. It has been suggested that lið could also refer to a "collection of ships."

þialfi × auk × hulmnlauk × litu × raisa × staina þisa × ala × at baka × sun sin × is ati × ain × sir × skib × auk × austr × stu[rþi ×] i × ikuars × liþ × kuþ hialbi × ąt × baka × ask(i)l × raist
Þialfi {} ok {} Holmlaug {} lētu {} ræisa {} stæina þessa {} alla {} at Banka/Bagga, {} sun sinn. {} Es ātti {} æinn {} sēʀ {} skip {} ok {} austr {} stȳrði {} ī {} Ingvars {} lið. {} Guð hialpi {} and {} Banka/Bagga. {} Æskell {} ræist.
"Þjalfi and Holmlaug had all of these stones raised in memory of Banki/Baggi, their son, who alone owned a ship and steered to the east in Ingvarr's retinue. May God help Banki's/Baggi's spirit. Áskell carved."

=== U 837 ===
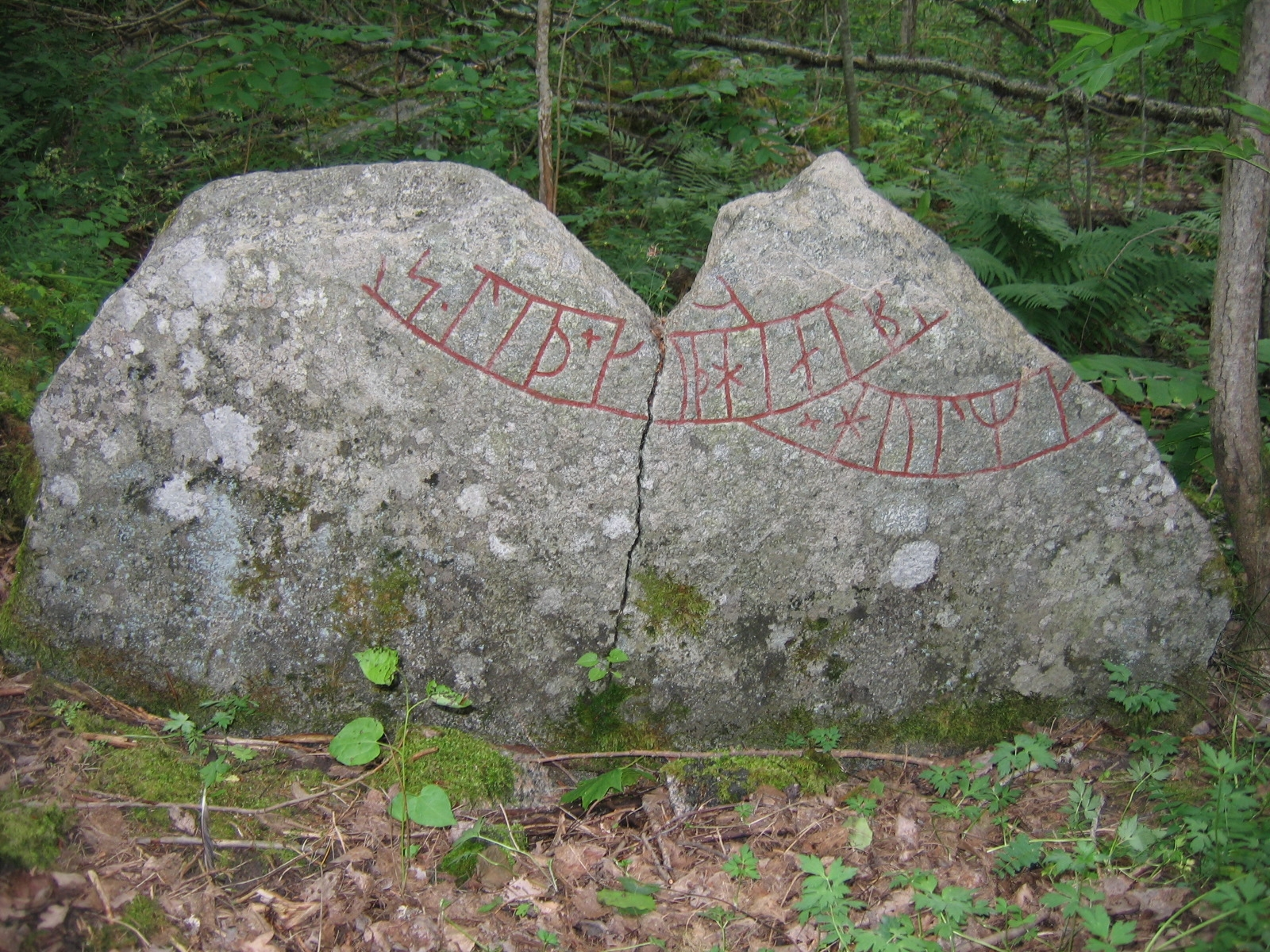
Runestone U 837

This stone is located in Alsta, Nysätra. It was discovered in the 1940s by a local boy, and an unsuccessful search was initiated to find the remaining parts. It is presently located in the forest about 100 metres from the road. Its identity as an Ingvar runestone is based on the remaining runes -rs + liþ, which agree with ikuars × liþ ("Ingvar's retinue") on runestone U 778.

... ...k × hulmk... ... ...(r)s + liþ × kuþ × hialb(i) ...
... [o]k {} Holmg[æiʀʀ](?) ... [Ingva]rs(?) {} lið. {} Guð {} hialpi ...
"... and Holmgeirr(?) ... Ingvarr's(?) retinue. May God help ..."

=== U 1143 ===
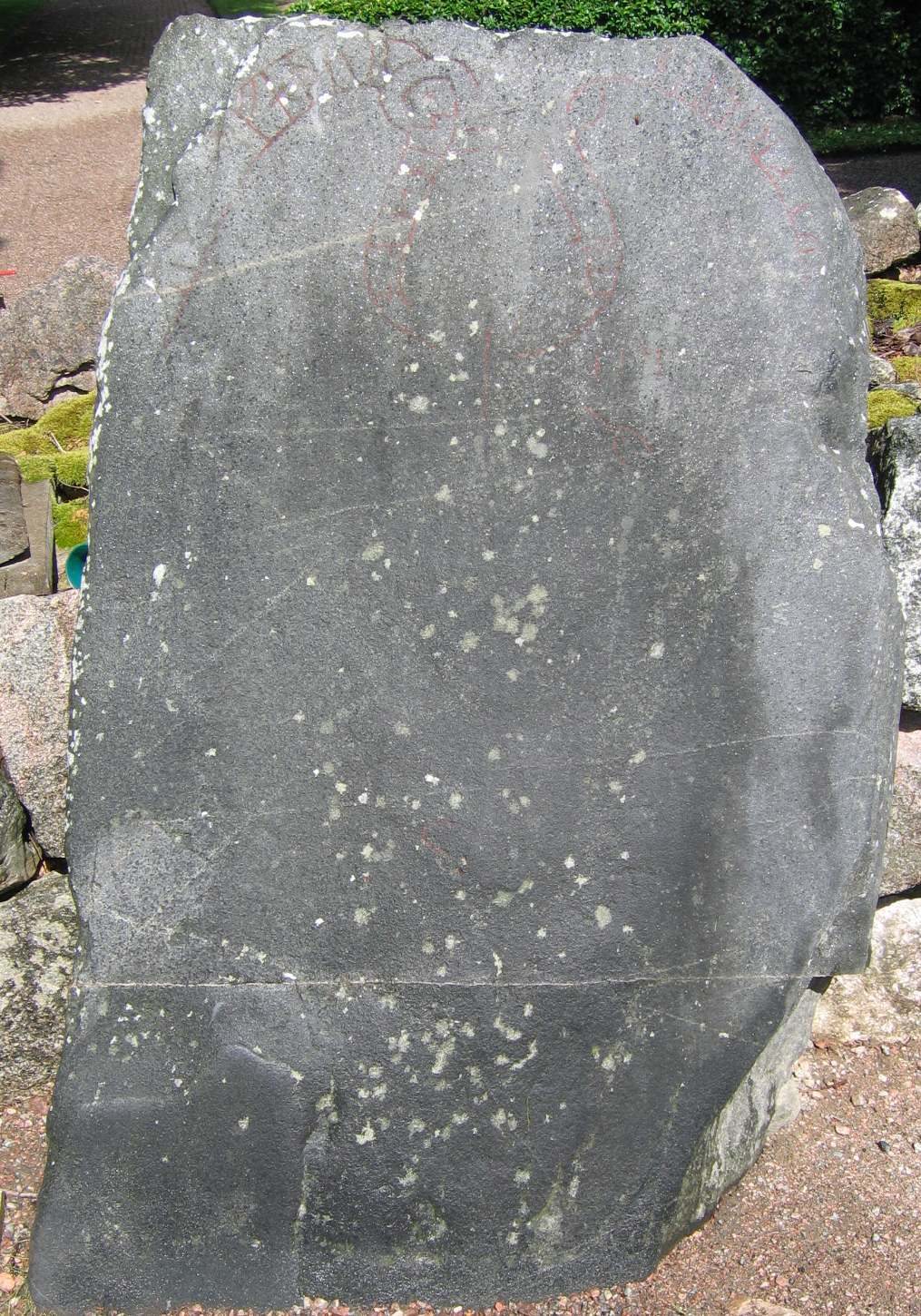
Runestone U 1143

This stone is located at the church of Tierp. It is tentatively categorized as style Pr1. Although very worn today, the text of the inscription is known from a drawing made by Johan Peringskiöld.

[klintr auk blikr × ristu stin × þinsi · iftiʀ kunu(i)þ] × faþur × sin + han [× foʀ bort miþ (i)kuari + kuþ trutin hialbi ont …](r)[a ·] kristin[a þuriʀ + t]r(ą)(n)[i × ri]s[ti +]
Klintr(?) ok Blæikʀ {} ræistu stæin {} þennsi {} æftiʀ Gunnvið, {} faður {} sinn. {} Hann {} fōr bort með Ingvari. {} Guð drōttinn hialpi and [ald]ra {} kristinna. Þōriʀ {} [ru]na[ʀ](?)/[Tr]an[i](?) {} risti. {}
"Klettr(?) and Bleikr raised this stone in memory of Gunnviðr, their father. He travelled away with Ingvarr. May Lord God help the spirits of all Christians. Þórir carved the runes(?) / Þórir the Crane(?) carved."

=== U Fv1992;157 ===
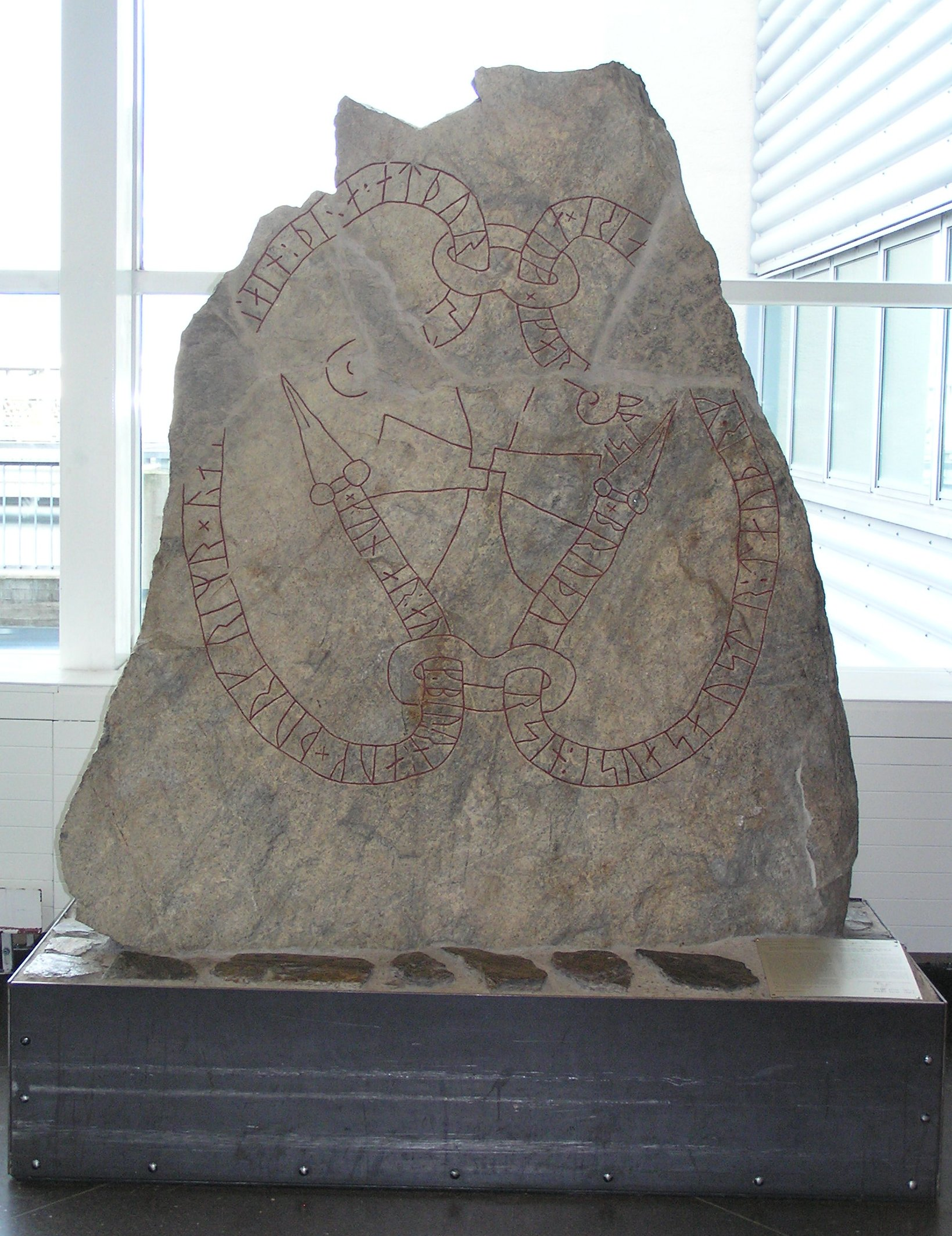
Runestone U FV 1992;157

This stone in style Fp was reported by road construction workers on April 6, 1990. A runologist arrived and noted that it was missing some parts. It was also lying with text upwards and it had probably been dug up and moved by machinery the previous winter from somewhere in the vicinity. The existence of lichen showed that it had not been completely covered by soil. Later in the month, an archaeological excavation uncovered two missing pieces of the stone. On the 23rd it was moved to the museum of Sigtuna and on May 16, it was transported to a stonemason who mended the stone.

The stone is a light grey and finely grained granite, and it is 2.30 m tall and 1.73 m wide. The runemaster does not appear to have prepared the surface much and so the surface is quite coarse, but still the runes are legible. It was made by the same runemaster as the Ingvar runestone U 439 and probably the Ingvar runestone U 661. It is the only Ingvar runestone that talks of the construction of a bridge. The excavation had established that the stone had been located beside a road, and there was once a creek at the location across which the bridge had passed. The reference to bridge-building in the runic text is fairly common in rune stones during this time period and are interpreted as Christian references related to the soul passing the bridge into the afterlife. At this time, the Catholic Church sponsored the building of roads and bridges through the use of indulgences in return for intercession for the soul. There are many examples of these bridge stones dated from the 11th century, including runic inscriptions Sö 101, U 489, and U 617.

Since it could not be reerected at its original location, the Swedish Civil Aviation Administration arranged so that it could be installed in the new terminal 2 for domestic flights. It was inaugurated in the terminal with a solemn ceremony by the Civil Aviation Administration on May 17, 1992.

× kunar : auk biurn : auk × þurkrimr × ra-… …tain : þina · at þurst… × bruþur sin : is uas austr : tauþr · m… …ari × auk × karþ… …u þisi
{} Gunnarr {} ok Biorn {} ok {} Þorgrīmʀ {} ræ[istu s]tæin {} þenna {} at Þorst[æin] {} brōður sinn, {} es vas austr {} dauðr {} m[eð Ingv]ari, {} ok {} gærð[u br]ō þessi.
"Gunnarr and Bjôrn and Þorgrímr raised this stone in memory of Þorsteinn, their brother, who was dead in the east with Ingvarr, and made this bridge."

== Södermanland ==
=== Sö 9 ===
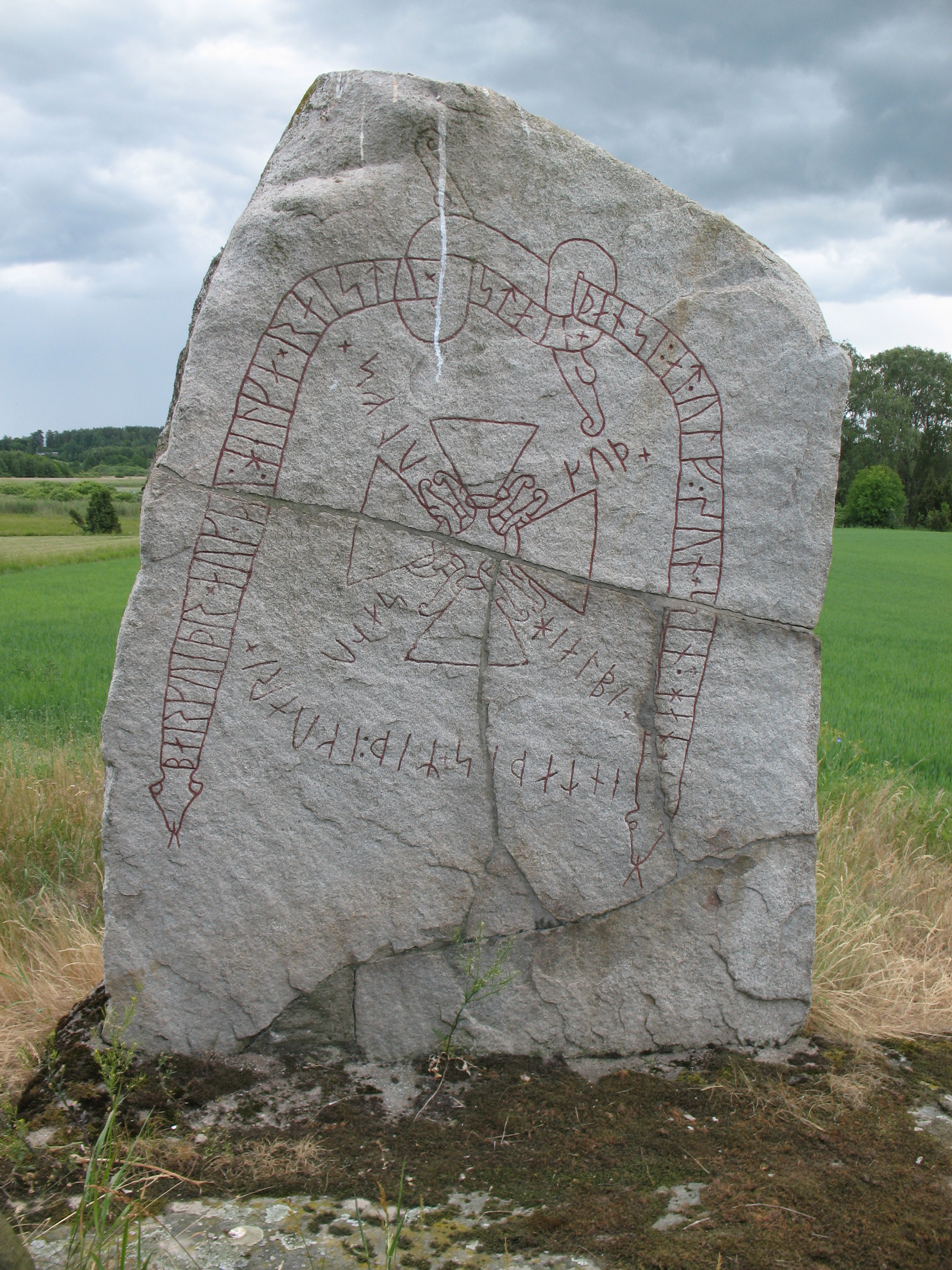
Runestone Sö 9

This stone is located in Lifsinge and it is in style Fp. The runemaster used the imagery of the cross in the center to emphasize salvation; the text meaning "may God help Ulfr's soul" surrounds the cross.

barkuiþr × auk × þu : helka × raistu × stain × þansi : at · ulf : sun · sin · han × entaþis + miþ : ikuari + kuþ + hialbi + salu ulfs ×
Bergviðr/Barkviðr {} ok {} þau {} Hælga {} ræistu {} stæin {} þannsi {} at {} Ulf, {} sun {} sinn. {} Hann {} ændaðis {} með {} Ingvari. {} Guð {} hialpi {} sālu Ulfs. {}
"Bergviðr/Barkviðr and Helga, they raised this stone in memory of Ulfr, their son. He met his end with Ingvarr. May God help Ulfr's soul."

=== Sö 96 ===
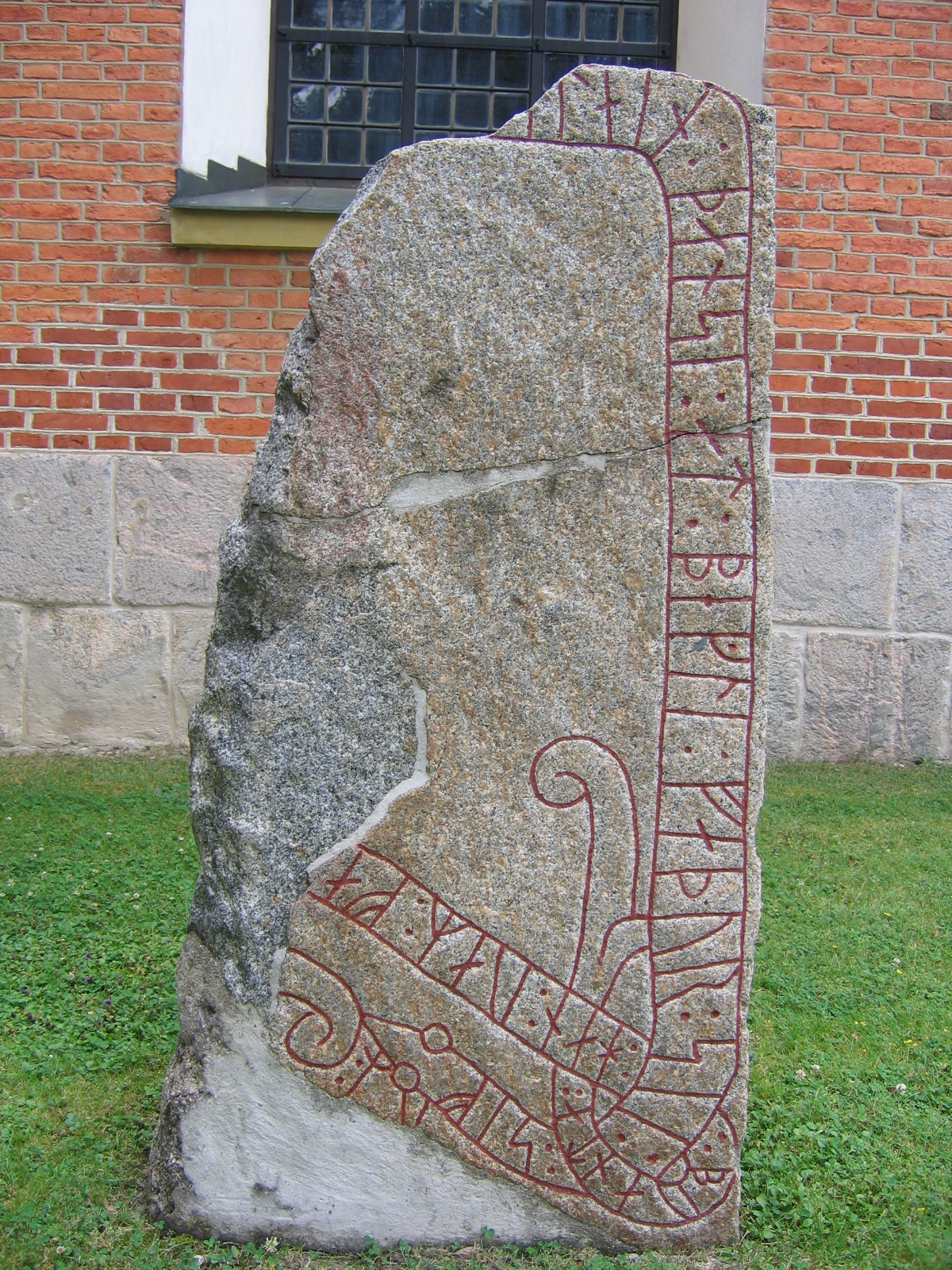
Runestone Sö 96

This stone in style Fp is located at the church of Jäder.

-(t)ain : þansi : at : begli : faþur : sii :: buanta :: sifuʀ :: han : uaʀ : fa... ...
[s]tæin {} þannsi {} at {} Bægli, {} faður {} sinn, {} bōanda {} Sæfuʀ. {} Hann {} vaʀ {} fa[rinn](?) ...
"this stone in memory of Beglir, his father, Sæfa's husbandman. He travelled(?) ..."

=== Sö 105 ===
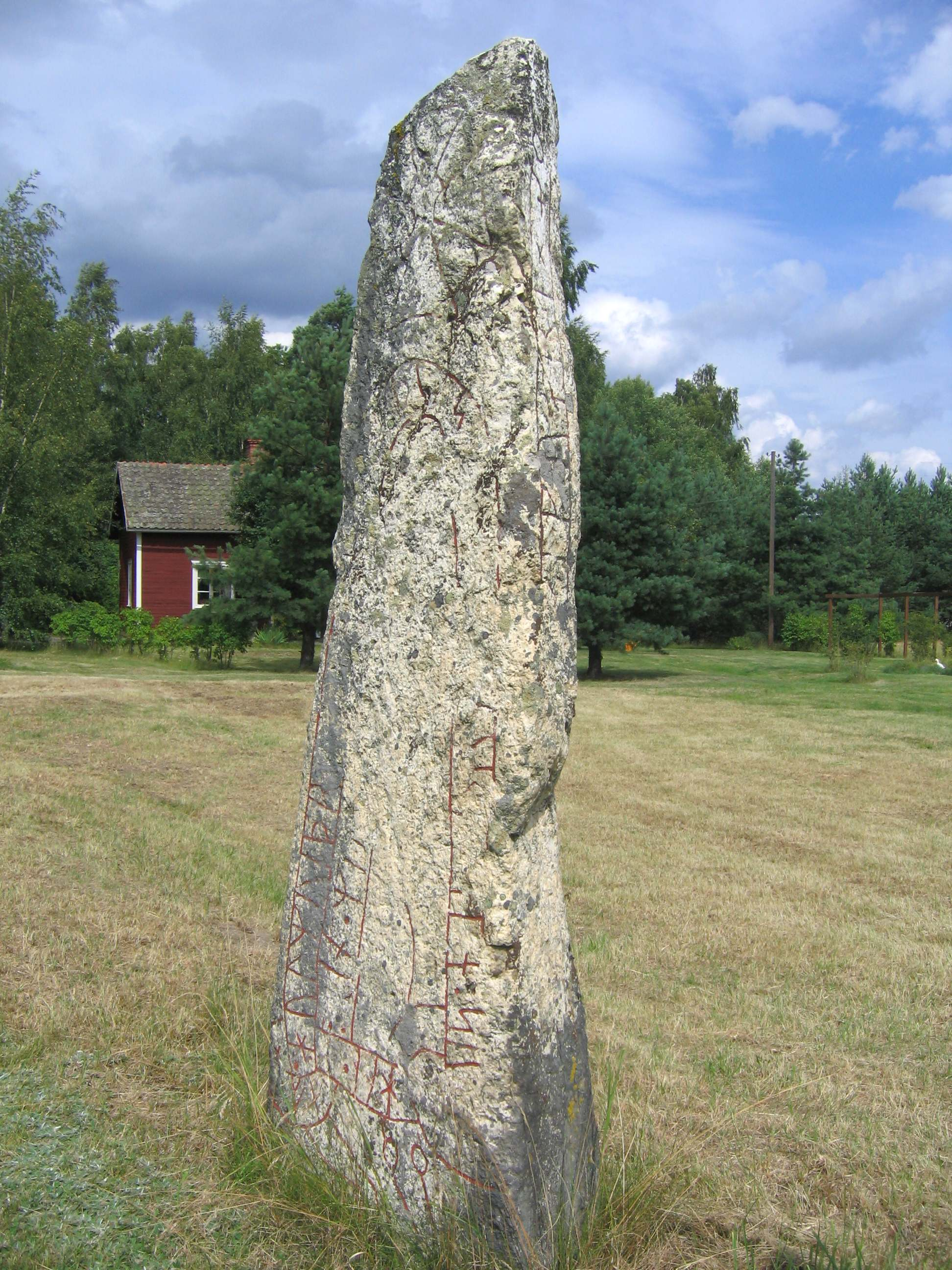
Runestone Sö 105

This stone in style Fp is located in Högstena, Södermanland. It was raised by Holmviðr in memory of his son Þorbjörn.

Based on other runestones, the wider family connections of those mentioned on this runestone has been reconstructed as follows: Holmviðr was a wealthy landowner who also appears on the runestone Sö 116. He was married to Gýriðr, the sister of Sigfastr, the owner of Snottsta, who is mentioned on runestones U 623 and U 331, but for further information on the family saga of Sigfastr and his descendants, see the articles Gerlög and Inga, and Estrid.

: hulmuiþr : -þi-(s)… …(ʀ) …ur--(r)- su[n] {} han : uaʀ : fa-in : m(i)- : ikuari ×+
{} Holmviðr {} ... {} [Þ]or[bæ]r[n](?) sun [sinn]. Hann {} vaʀ {} fa[r]inn {} me[ð] {} Ingvari. {}
"Holmviðr ... Þorbjǫrn(?), his son. He travelled with Ingvarr."

=== Sö 107 ===
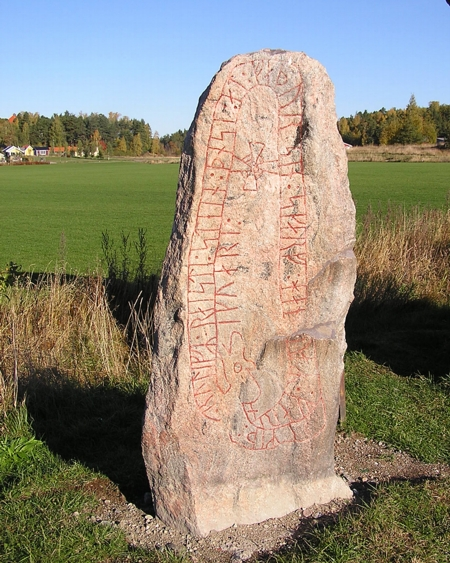
Runestone Sö 107

This stone was originally located in Balsta. It was moved to Eskilstuna in the 17th century, and then moved to Gredby in 1930 adjacent to Sö 108 and Sö 109. It is tentatively categorized as style Pr2. The name Skarfr from the inscription translates as "cormorant."

: rulifʀ : raisti : stein : þnsi : at : faþur : sin : skarf : ha[n] uaʀ : farin : miþ : ikuari :
{} Hrōðlæifʀ {} ræisti {} stæin {} þennsi/þannsi {} at {} faður {} sinn {} Skarf. {} Hann vaʀ {} farinn {} með {} Ingvari. {}
"Hróðleifr raised this stone in memory of his father Skarfr. He travelled with Ingvarr."

=== Sö 108 ===
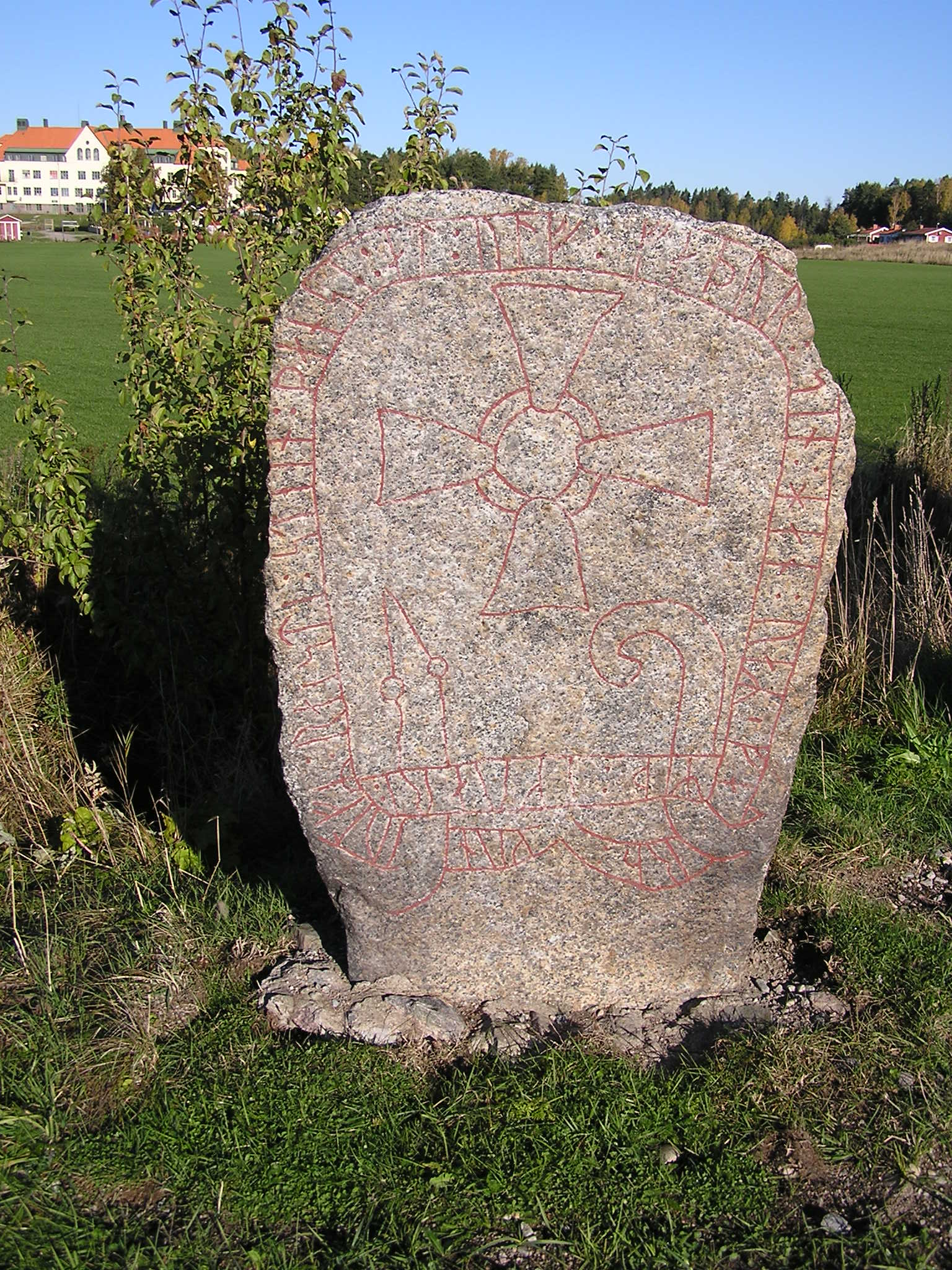
Runestone Sö 108

This stone in style Fp is located in Gredby. The father's name Ulf means "wolf," while the son Gunnulf's name combines gunnr to make "war-wolf."

kunulfʀ : raisti : stein : þansi : at : ulf : faþur : sin : han : uaʀ i : faru : miþ : ikuari :
Gunnulfʀ {} ræisti {} stæin {} þannsi {} at {} Ulf, {} faður {} sinn. {} Hann {} vaʀ ī {} faru {} með {} Ingvari. {}
"Gunnulfr raised this stone in memory of Ulfr, his father. He was on a voyage with Ingvarr."

=== Sö 131 ===
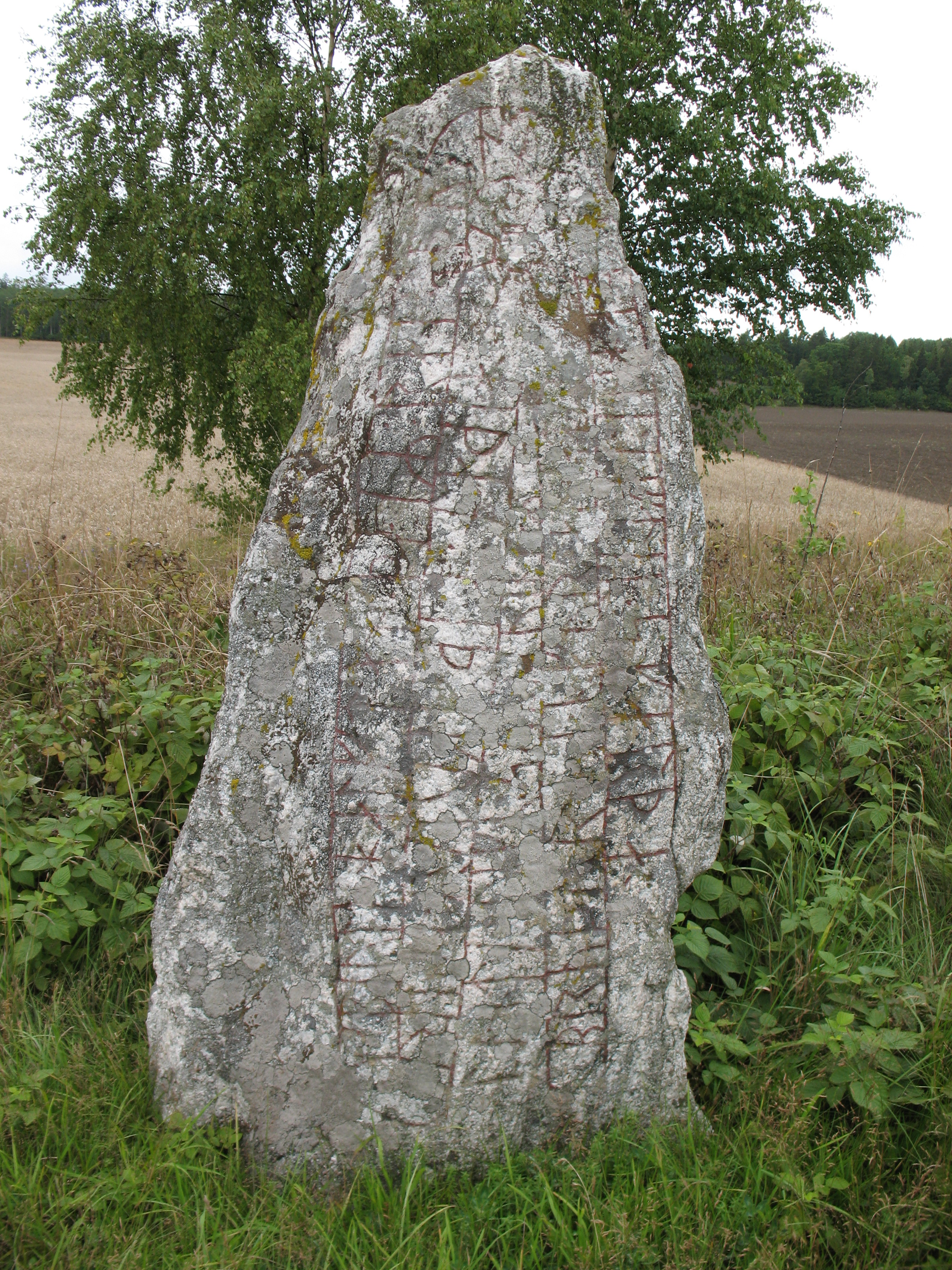
Runestone Sö 131

This stone in style RAK is one of the Serkland Runestones, and it is located in Lundby. When Richard Dybeck visited the grave field in the mid-19th century, someone pointed out a stone which rose only three inches above the ground and which was said to be "written". Dybeck excavated the stone and discovered that it was a runestone with an interesting inscription. In Dybeck's time, there were also the remains of a stone ship next to the runestone.

Skarði is a rather unusual name, but it appears in runic inscriptions in Sweden, Norway and Denmark. The name is probably derived from a word for "score" and it probably refers to someone who is hare lipped. The name Spjóti is also unusual and the unique name Spjót is found on the nearby Kjula Runestone. The word heðan ("from here") is only found in one single Viking Age runic inscription.

The last part of the inscription is an alliterative poem. This kind of verse appears on several runestones and it is well known from Old West Norse poetry.

: sbiuti : halftan : þaiʀ : raisþu : stain : þansi : eftiʀ : skarþa : bruþur sin : fur : austr : hiþan : miþ : ikuari : ą sirklanti : likʀ : sunʀ iuintaʀ
{} Spiūti, {} Halfdan, {} þæiʀ {} ræisþu {} stæin {} þannsi {} æftiʀ {} Skarða, {} brōður sinn. {} Fōr {} austr {} hēðan {} með {} Ingvari, {} ą̄ Særklandi {} liggʀ {} sunʀ Øyvindaʀ.
"Spjóti (and) Halfdan, they raised this stone in memory of Skarði, their brother. From here (he) travelled to the east with Ingvarr; in Serkland lies Eyvindr's son."

=== Sö 173 ===
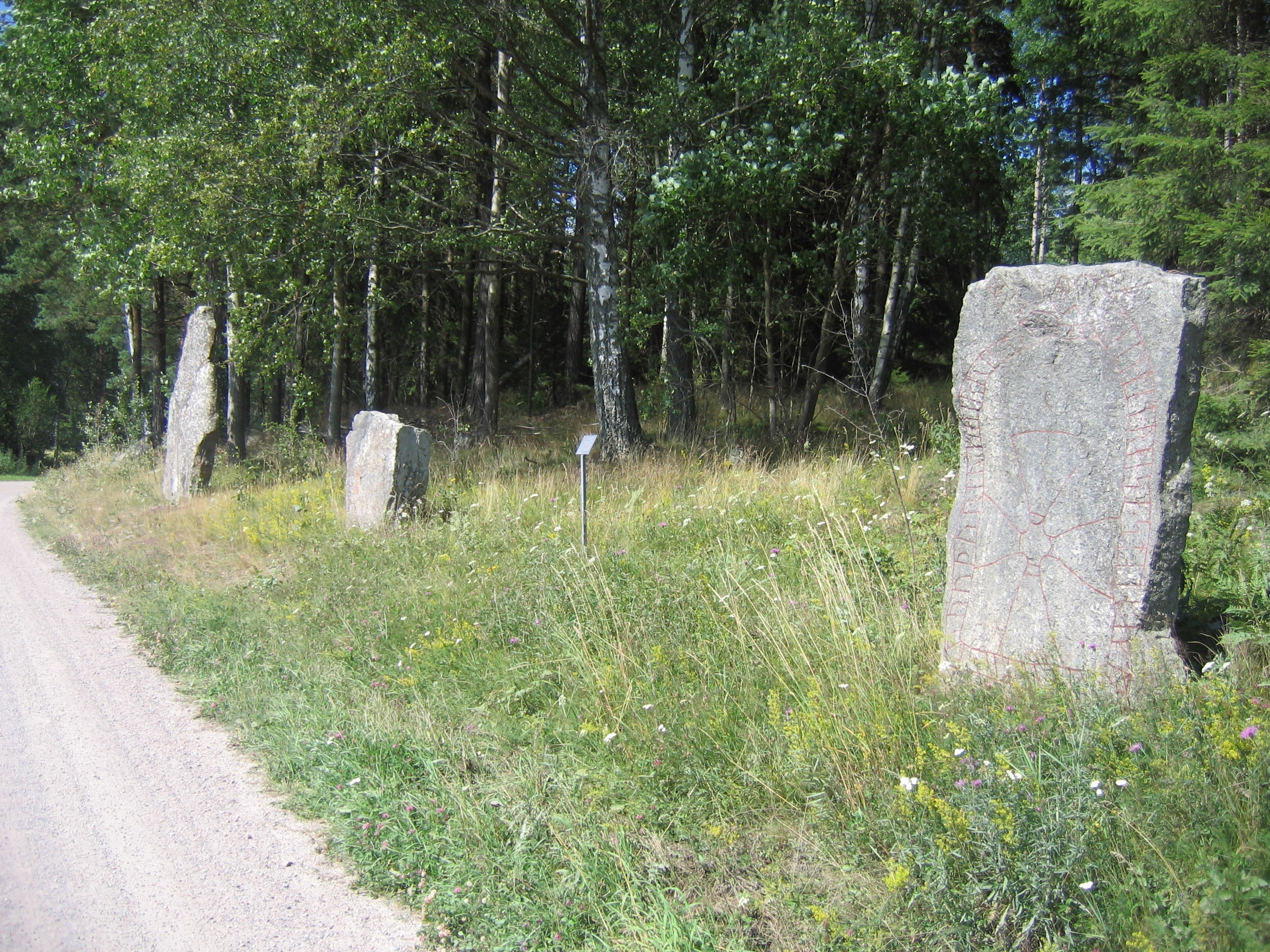
The three raised stones at Tystberga.

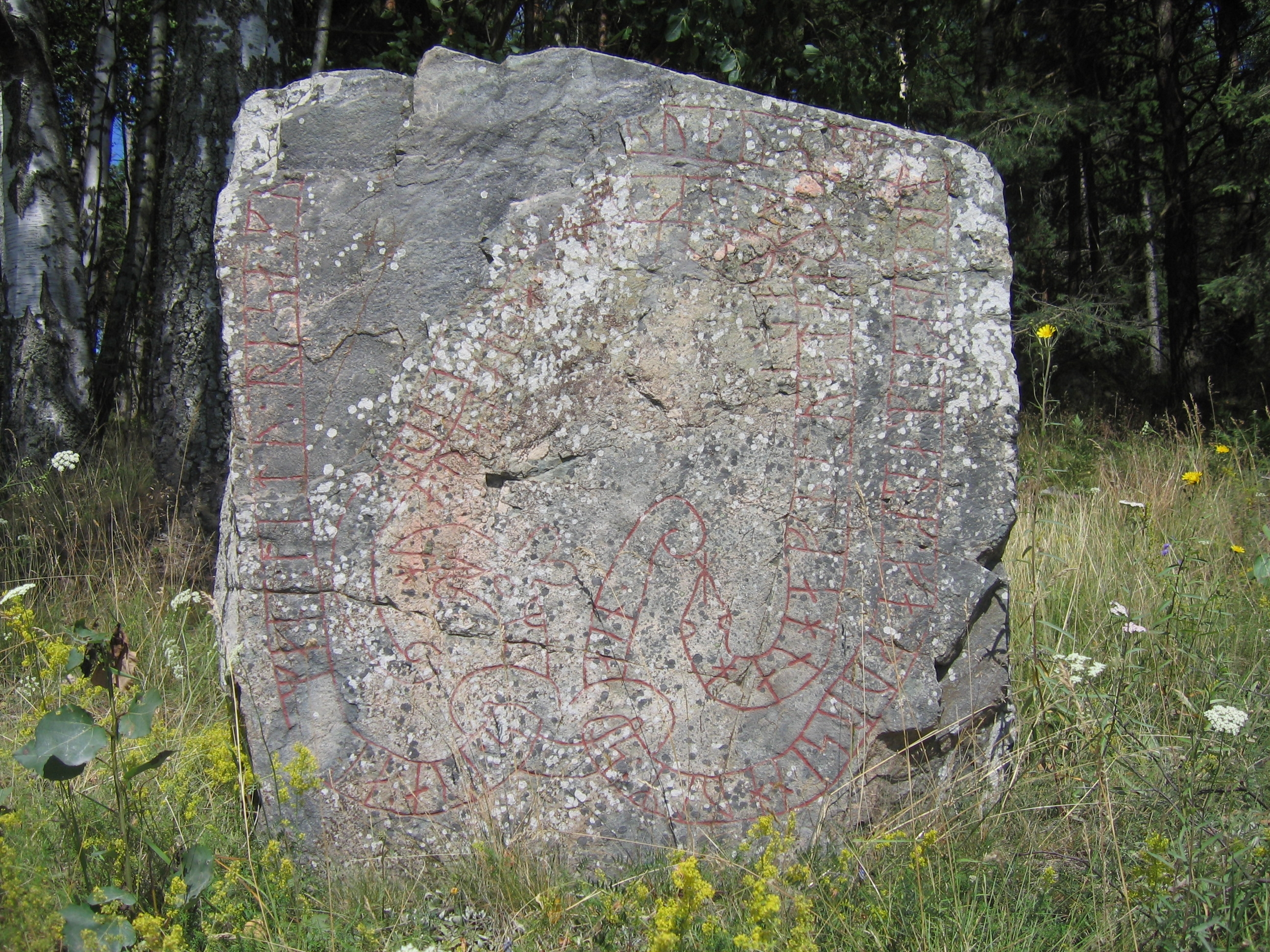
Runestone Sö 173

In the village of Tystberga there are three raised stones. Two of them are runestones called Sö 173 and Sö 374, of which the last one has a cross. Sö 173 is categorized as both style Fp and style Pr2. Both inscriptions are from the 11th century and tell of the same family. They probably refer to Viking expeditions both westwards and eastwards.

The location was first described by Lukas Gadd during the nationwide revision of pre-historic monuments that took place in the 17th century. In a paddock at the state owned homestead of Tystberga there was a flat stone lying with runes and next to it there was another flat stone that was leaning. In addition, there was a large square stone surrounded with rows of smaller stones, which Gadd described as a "fairly large cemetery". Not far from the stones, there were also two giant passage graves, about 20 paces long.

There is a depiction of the cross-less stone from the 17th century, made by Johan Hadorph and Johan Peringskiöld. This depiction has helped scholars reconstruct the parts that are damaged today. The runestone was raised anew by Richard Dybeck in 1864. In 1936, Ivar Schnell examined the stone, and he noted that there was a large stone next to it. When this stone was raised, they discovered that it was also a runestone, and it was probably the one that had been previously described by Lukas Gadd as the "square stone". In the vicinity, Schnell found a destroyed stone without runes which probably was the leaning stone described by Gadd. Since they would hinder agriculture, the three stones were re-erected at a distance of 60 metres, at the side of the road. The stone circle and the other monuments described by Gadd could not be found anymore.

The runes mani can be interpreted in two ways, since runic inscriptions never repeat two runes. One possibility is that it refers to Máni, the moon, and the other alternative is the male name Manni which is derived from maðr ("man"). The runes mus:kia are more challenging and the older interpretation that it was Mus-Gea is now rejected. It is probably a nominalization of myskia which means "darken" as during sunset, and one scholar has suggested that it could mean "sunset" and "twilight" and refer to e.g. a hair colour. A second theory is that the name refers to the animal bat. It is also disputed whether it is a man's name or a woman's name, but most scholars think that it refers to a woman. The name Myskia appears in a second runic inscription in Södermanland, and it may refer to the same person.

The last part of the cross-less inscription is both unusual and partly problematic. The word ystarla could without context be interpreted as both "westwards" and "eastwards", but since an austarla appears later in the inscription, it is agreed that ystarla means "westwards". It is unusual, but not unique, that the y-rune represents the v phoneme. An additional reason for this interpretation is the fact that it would allow the last part of the inscription to be interpreted as a poem in the meter fornyrðislag. This would explain the use of the rune since vestarla permits alliteration with um vaʀit. It is not known whether he refers to Hróðgeirr (Roger) or Holmsteinn, but most think that it is Holmsteinn who had been westwards. The plural ending -u in the verb form dou shows that both Hróðgeirr and Holmsteinn died in the Ingvar expedition.

mus:kia/mes:kia : a(u)[k :] (m)an(i) : litu : rasa : ku[(m)(l) : þausi : at : b]ruþur · (s)in : hr(u)þkaiʀ · auk : faþur sin hulm:stain ·
Myskia {} ok {} Manni/Māni {} lētu {} ræisa {} kumbl {} þausi {} at {} brōður {} sinn {} Hrōðgæiʀ {} ok {} faður sinn Holmstæin. {}
"Myskja and Manni/Máni had these monuments raised in memory of their brother Hróðgeirr and their father Holmsteinn."

· han hafþi · ystarla u(m) : uaʀit · lenki : tuu : a:ustarla : meþ : inkuari
{} Hann hafði {} vestarla um {} vaʀit {} længi, {} dōu {} austarla {} með {} Ingvari.
"He had long been in the west; they died in the east with Ingvarr."

=== Sö 179 ===
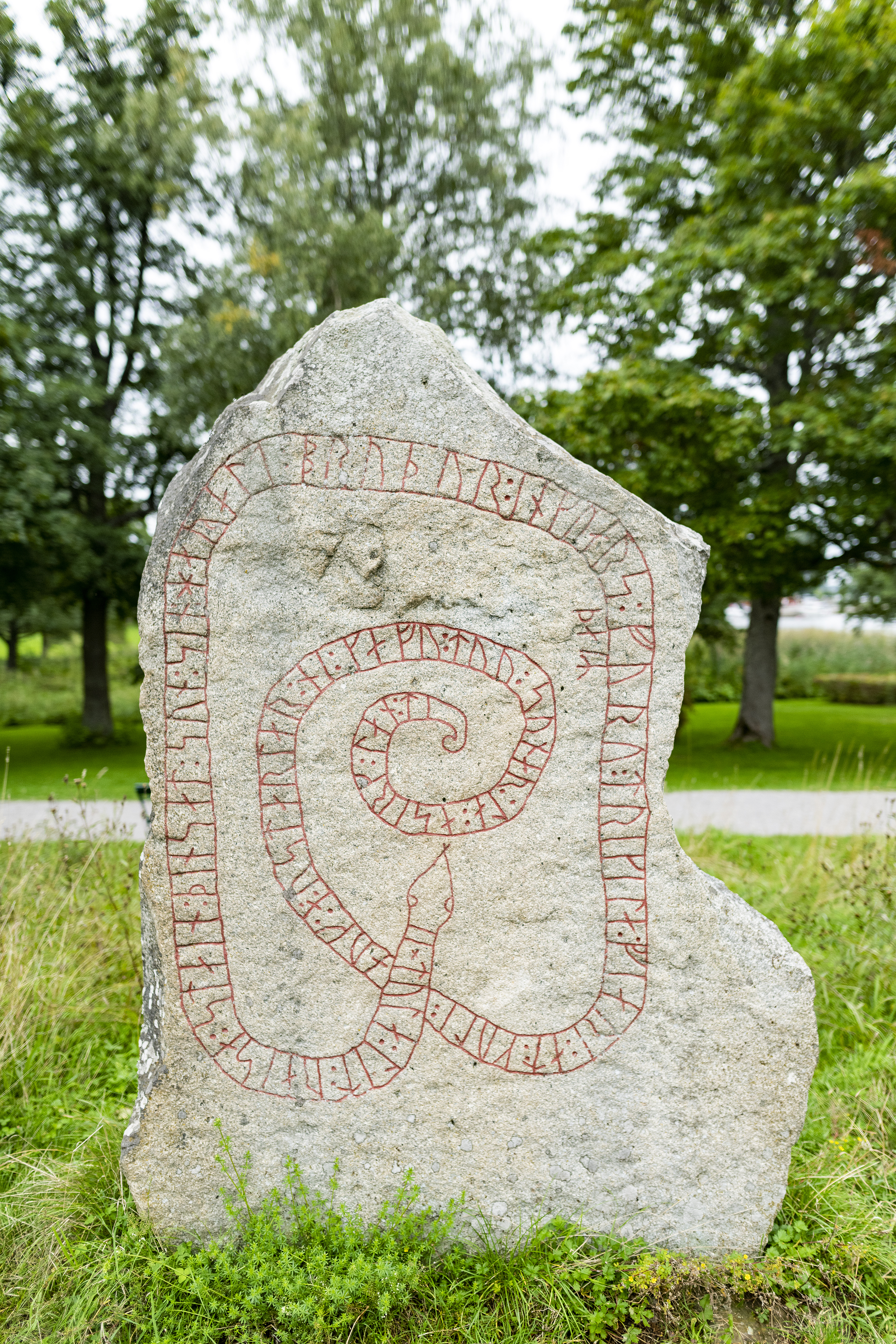
Runestone Sö 179

A reading of the Gripsholm stone's text in Old East Norse.

The Gripsholm Runestone is one of the Serkland Runestones and it is in style Fp. It is located beside the drive of Gripsholm Castle together with another runestone from the 11th century, Sö 178, but their original location is unknown.

The runestone was discovered in the early 1820s by Wallin, the caretaker of the castle, and it was then forming the threshold of the cellar of the eastern tower of the castle, the so-called "theatre tower". It was under both side walls of the door and also covered with tar, which suggests that it had been part of another construction before being used as construction material for the castle. It would take an additional 100 years before the stone was retrieved from the castle and could be read in its entirety.

The inscription says that it is raised in memory of Haraldr, the brother of Ingvar, and he is believed to have died in the region of the Caspian Sea. A subject that has been vividly discussed is why the runestone is raised only after Haraldr and not after Ingvar, and the most widely accepted explanation is that Tóla was only Harald's mother and that the two men were only half-brothers. It is also possible that there were originally two stones of which one was in memory of Ingvar, but that Ingvar's stone has disappeared. A third possibility is that "brother" refers to brother-in-arms, blood brother, or something similar, and this is a use of the word that appears on one of the runestones in Hällestad in Scania.

One theory proposed by Braun connects this stone to the runestones U 513, U 540, and Sö 279, and it holds Ingvar the Far-Travelled to be the son of the Swedish king Emund the Old.

The second half of the inscription is in alliterative verse of the form fornyrðislag. The phrase to feed the eagle is a kenning which means "to kill enemies".

× tula : lit : raisa : stain : þinsa| |at : sun : sin : haralt : bruþur : inkuars : þaiʀ furu : trikila : fiari : at : kuli : auk : a:ustarla| |ar:ni : kafu : tuu : sunar:la : a sirk:lan:ti
{} Tōla {} lēt {} ræisa {} stæin {} þennsa at {} sun {} sinn {} Harald, {} brōður {} Ingvars. {} Þæiʀ fōru {} drængila {} fiarri {} at {} gulli {} ok {} austarla ærni {} gāfu, {} dōu {} sunnarla {} ą̄ Særklandi.
"Tóla had this stone raised in memory of her son Haraldr, Ingvarr's brother. They travelled manfully far for gold, and in the east gave (food) to the eagle. (They) died in the south in Serkland."

=== Sö 254 ===
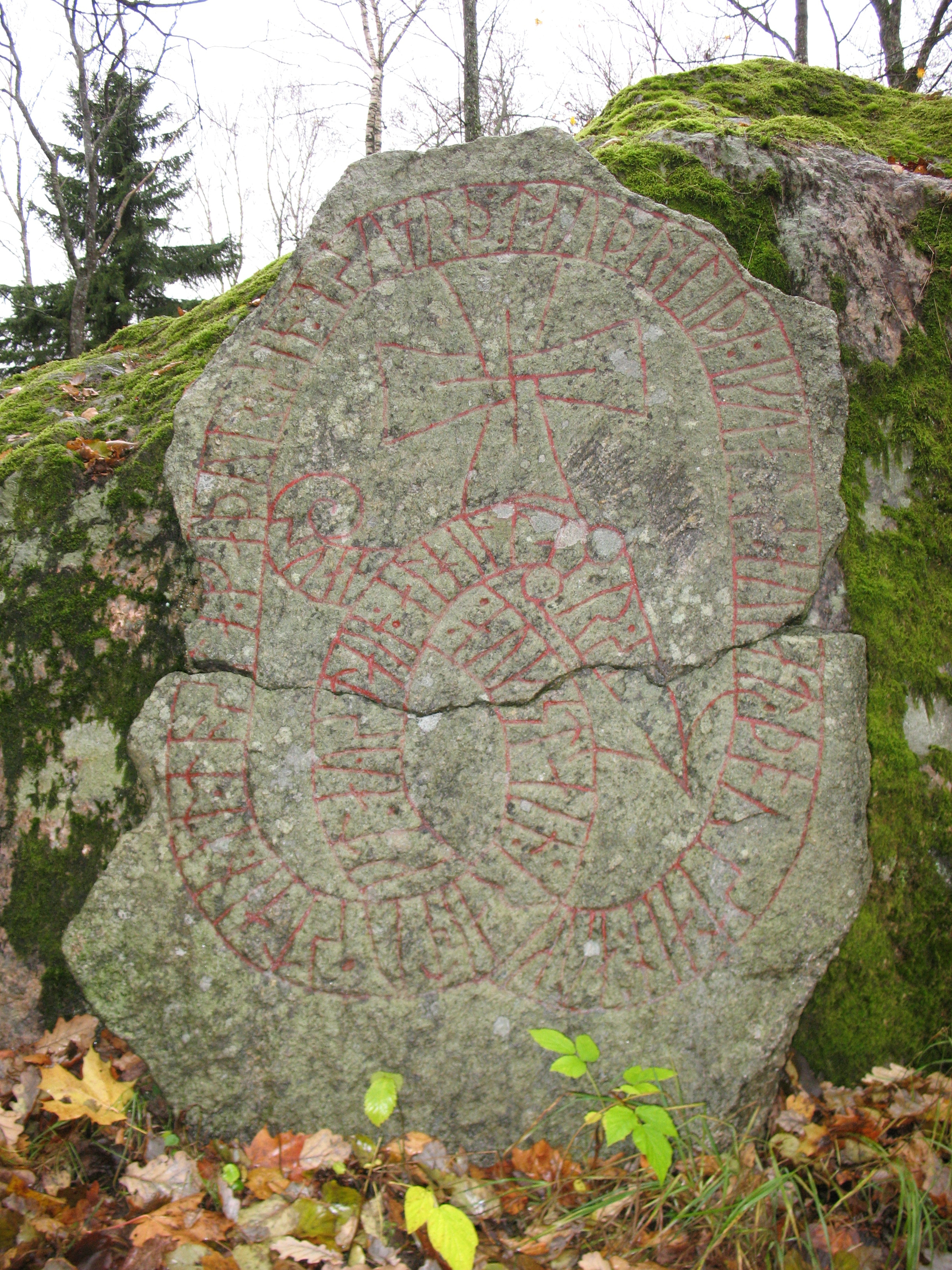
Runestone Sö 254

This stone is located in Vansta and it is in style Fp.

· suan : auk stain : raistu · stain : at · tos(t)a : faþur : sin : is uarþ : tauþr · i liþi : ikuars : au(k) at · þo(r)stain : auk kt : aystain : alhiltar · s--
{} Svæinn {} ok Stæinn {} ræistu {} stæin {} at {} Tosta, {} faður {} sinn, {} es varð {} dauðr {} ī liði {} Ingvars, {} ok at {} Þorstæin {} ok at {} Øystæin, {} Alfhildaʀ {} s[un].
"Sveinn and Steinn raised the stone in memory of Tosti, their father, who died in Ingvarr's retinue, and in memory of Þorsteinn, and in memory of Eysteinn, Alfhildr's son."

=== Sö 277 ===
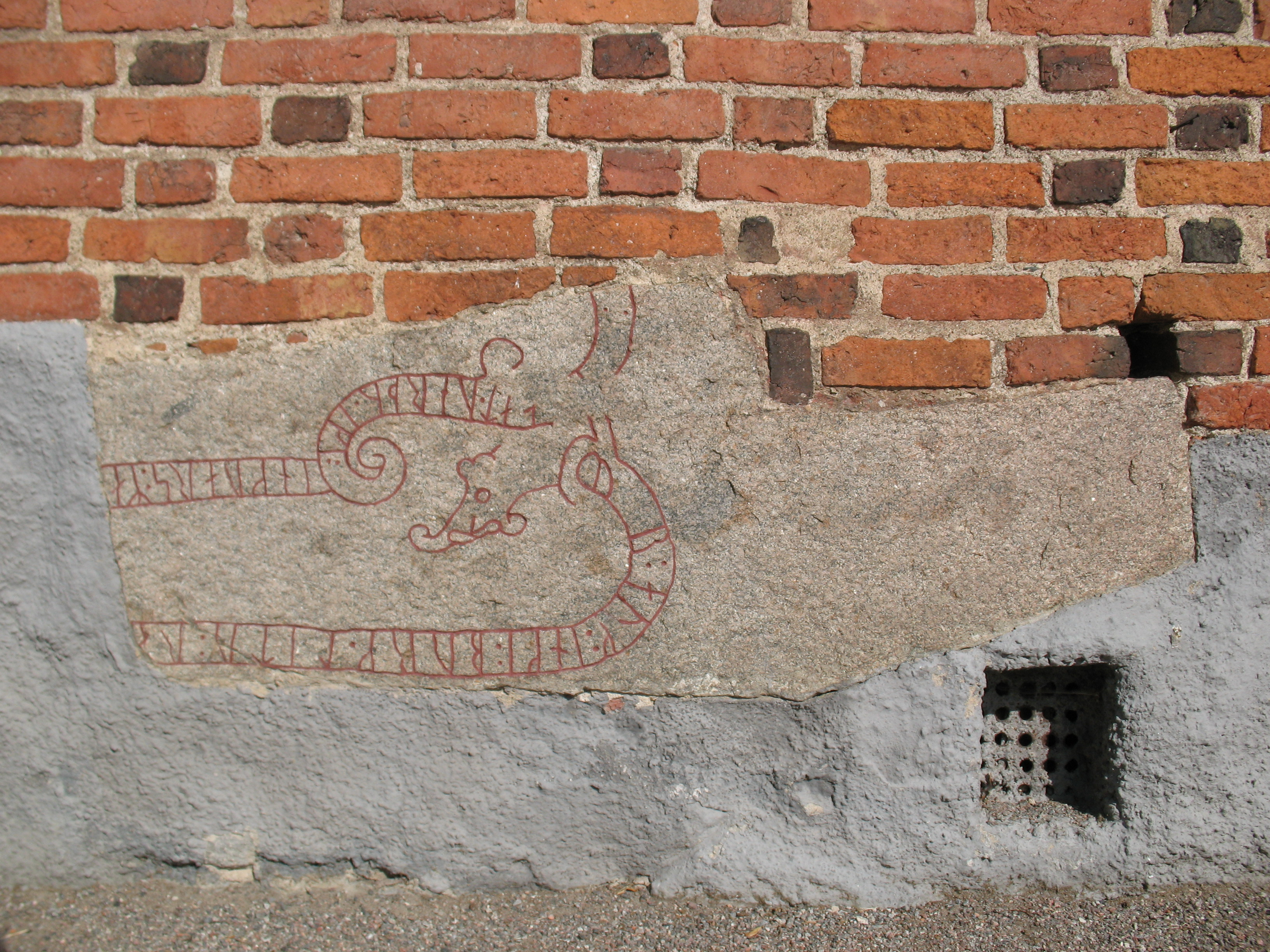
Runestone Sö 277

This stone is located at the cathedral of Strängnäs, and it is in style Pr2.

u--r : auk : inki:burk : (l)itu : ra... ... ...- : …a at · uerþr · iki : inkuars : ma... ...
{} {} ok {} Ingiborg {} lētu {} ræ[isa] ... ... {} ... <at> {} verðr {} ængi {} Ingvars {} ma[nna] ...
"and Ingibjǫrg, they had raised ... ... ... in memory of ... will not be among Ingvarr's men ..."

=== Sö 279 ===
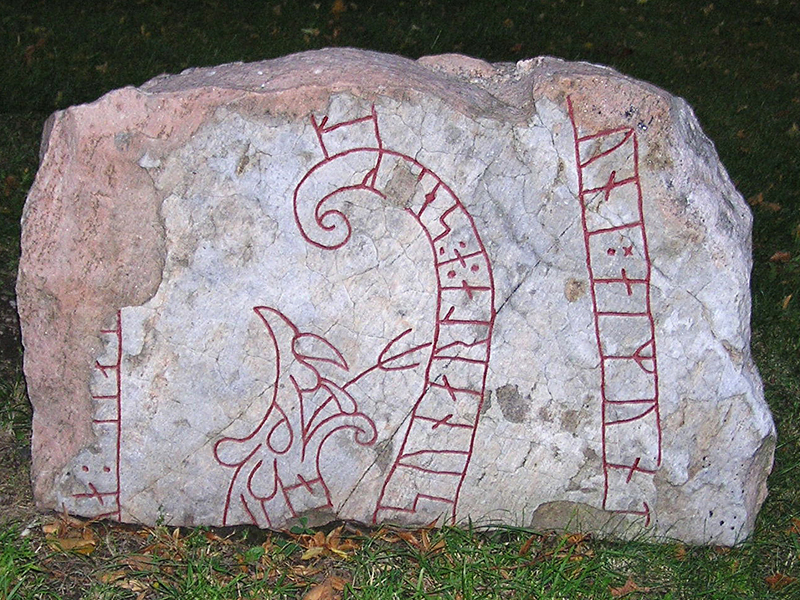
Runestone Sö 279

This stone is one of the Serkland Runestones and it is located at Strängnäs Cathedral. It is in style Pr2. One theory proposed by Braun connects this stone to the runestones U 513, U 540, and Sö 179, and it holds Ingvar the Far-Travelled to be the son of the Swedish king Emund the Old.

ai... ... ...(u)a : --(a)- ... ...uni ÷ aimunt... ... sunarla : a : se(r)kl...
Æi... ... [hagg]va {} [st]æ[in] ... [s]yni {} Æimund[aʀ] ... sunnarla {} ą̄ {} Særkl[andi].
"Ei-... ... the stone cut ... Eimundr's sons ... in the south in Serkland."

=== Sö 281 ===
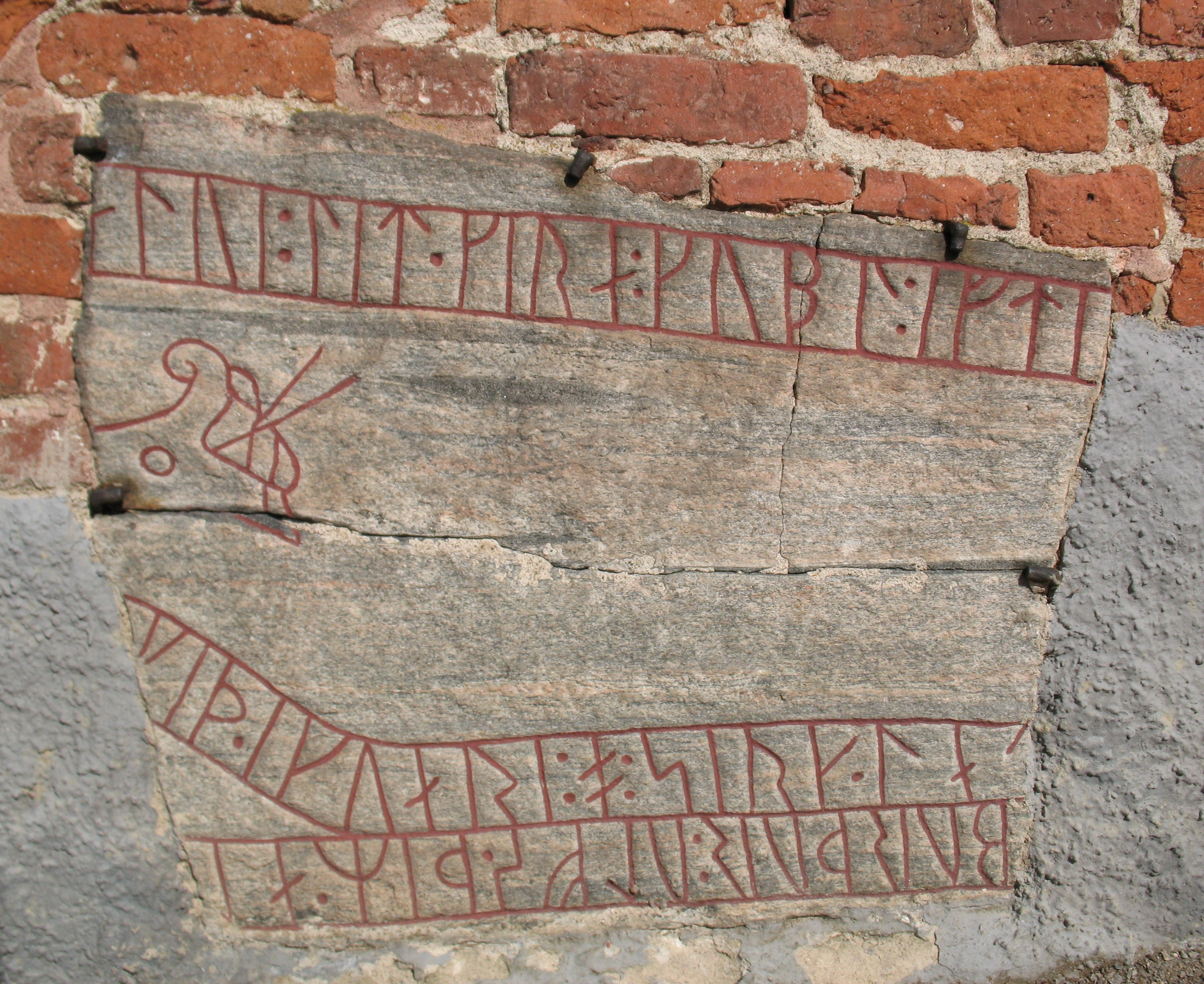
Runestone Sö 281

This stone is located at the Strängnäs Cathedral and it is in style Pr2.

(a)lui : lit * kira : kubl : ifti... ... burþur : ulfs * þiʀ * a(u)... ... (m)iþ * ikuari : ą : sirk*la(t)...
vī {} lēt {} gærva {} kumbl {} æfti[ʀ] ... brōður {} Ulfs. {} Þæiʀ {} au[str]/au[starla] ... með {} Ingvari {} ą̄ {} Særkland[i].
"-vé had the monument made in memory of ... Ulfr's brother. They in / to the east ... with Ingvarr in Serkland."

=== Sö 287 ===
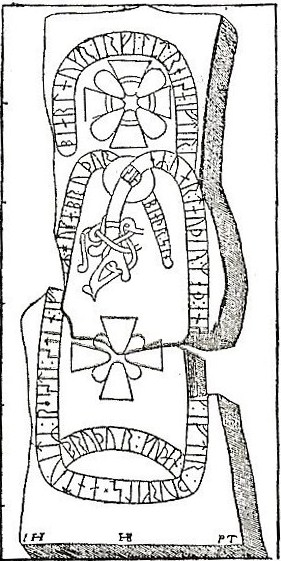
Runestone Sö 287 in a 17th-century drawing

This stone was located in Hunhammar, but it has disappeared.

[× antuitʀ : reisti : stin : iftiʀ : huka : bruþur sin eʀ : uar : tauþe(r) : miþ : ink... ...k : iftir : þurkils bruþur : kuþan biarlaukr : irfi : lit : reisa : iftir : biaþr : sin]
{} Andvēttr {} ræisti {} stæin {} æftiʀ {} Huga, {} brōður sinn, eʀ {} vaʀ {} dauðr {} með {} Ing[vari, o]k {} æftiʀ {} Þorgīls, brōður {} gōðan. Biarnlaugr {} ærfi(?) {} let {} ræisa {} æftiʀ {} faður(?) {} sinn.
"Andvéttr raised the stone in memory of Hugi, his brother, who died with Ingvarr, and in memory of Þorgísl, (his) good brother. Bjarnlaugr, the heir(?), had (the stone) raised in memory of his father(?)"

=== Sö 320 ===
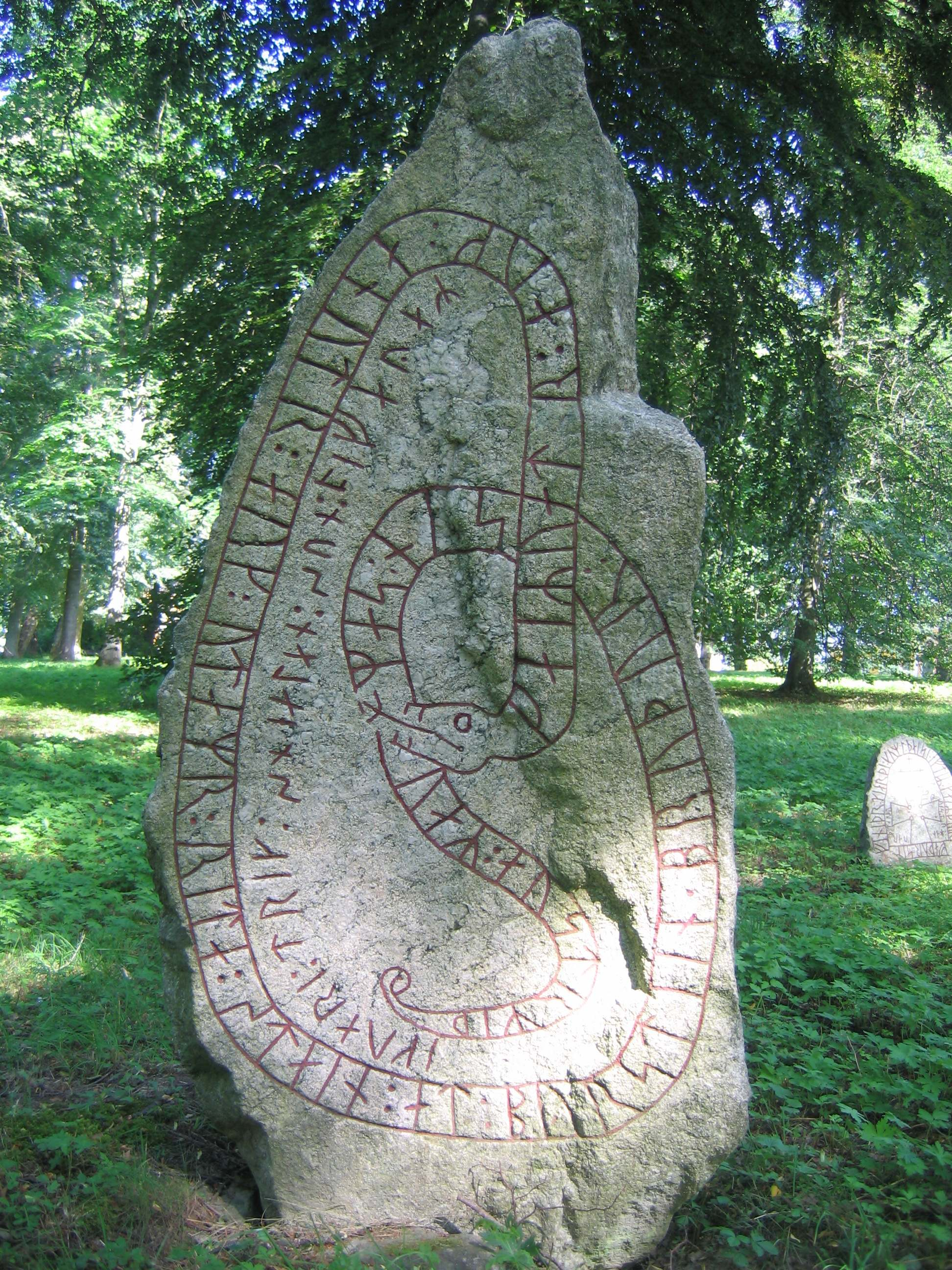
Runestone Sö 320

This stone is located in the park of the manor house Stäringe beside the runestone Sö 319. It is in style Fp.

: kaiʀuatr : auk : anutr : auk : utamr : rita : stain : at : byrst(a)in · bruþur : sin : saʀ uaʀ : austr · miþ ikuari : trik : snialan : sun : lifayaʀ ×
{} Gæiʀhvatr {} ok {} Anundr {} ok {} Ōtamʀ [lētu] rētta {} stæin {} at {} Bȳrstæin, {} brōður {} sinn, {} sāʀ vaʀ {} austr {} með Ingvari, {} dræng {} sniallan, {} sun {} Līføyaʀ. {}
"Geirhvatr and Ǫnundr and Ótamr had the stone erected in memory of Bjórsteinn, their brother. He was in the east with Ingvarr, an able valiant man, the son of Lífey."

=== Sö 335 ===
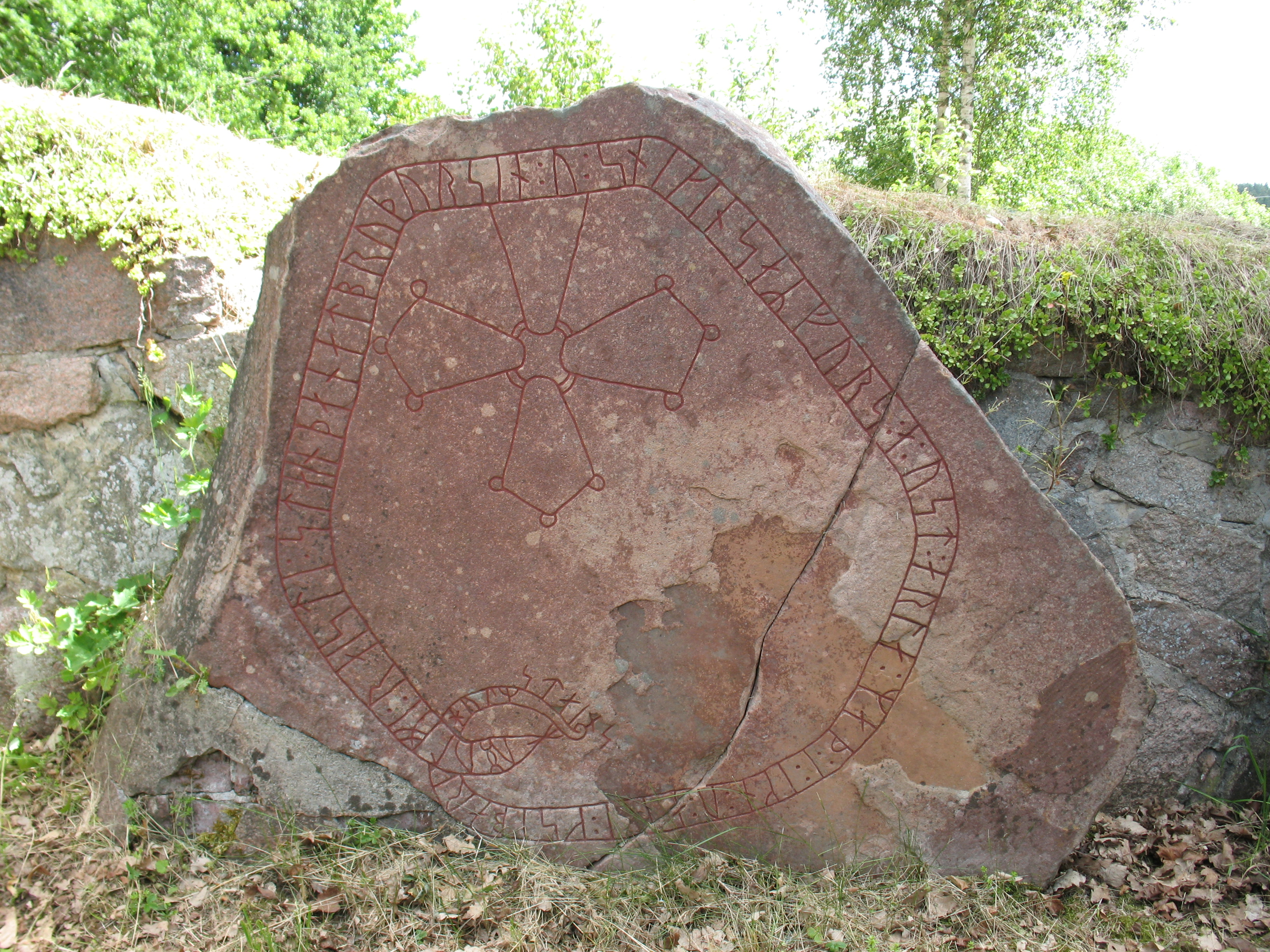
Runestone Sö 335

This stone is located at the church ruin of Ärja and it is in style Fp. It contains the word skipari which means "shipmate". This word is found in a second runestone in Södermanland and there are six other attestations in stones from southern Sweden and Denmark. From this usage, it seems that Holmsteinn was a captain of one of the ships of the expedition and Ósníkinn a crew member.

The first rune in the inscription is apparently superfluous, and this can be compared with the fact that the name Ingvar is spelled with two initial i-runes. What name was written in the first runes is not certain, but some scholars have proposed that it was a not hitherto known woman's name Ulfvi. Another proposal is that it was a misspelling of the name Ulfr or the rare name Ulfvid. The name Osnikin appears in half a dozen inscriptions in Uppland and Södermanland and it means, like osniken still does in modern Swedish, "generous."

u ulf=ui : raisti : stain þana| |at bruþur sin : u:snikin saʀ furs : a:ust:arla : maþ : i:ikn:u:ari : ksibari hulmstains
{} Ulfʀ(?) {} ræisti {} stæin þenna at brōður sinn {} Ōsnīkin, sāʀ fōrs {} austarla {} með {} Ingvari, {} skipari Holmstæins.
"Ulfr(?) raised this stone in memory of his brother Ósníkinn. He travelled to the east with Ingvarr; (he was) Holmsteinn's seaman."

== Västmanland ==
=== Vs 19 ===
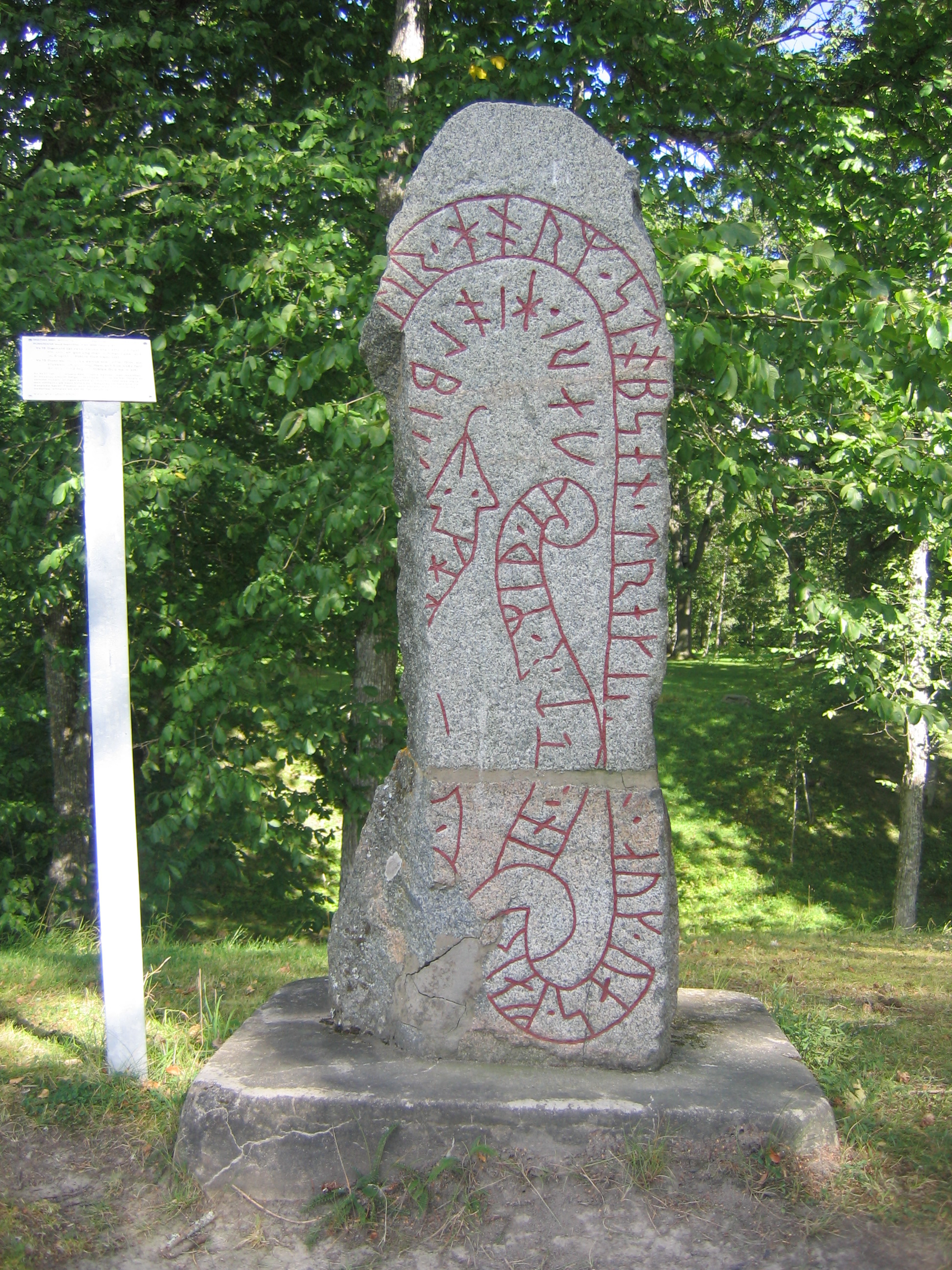
Runestone Vs 19

This stone is located in Berga, Skultuna. It is in style Fp and it is made by the same runemaster as runestone Vs 18. It is dated to the 1040s. The name Gunnvaldr in the inscription combines gunnr meaning "war" and valdr meaning "wielder" or "keeper," while the name Ormr means "serpent" or "dragon."

khu[nal-](r) · [(l)it … stain · þinsa ef]tir · horm · stob sen · trek| |ku-…n · auk · uas · farin · (o)(s)-r · miþ · ikuari · hiolbi k[-þ · salu h…ns ·]
Gunnal[d]r {} lēt [ræisa] stæin {} þennsa æftiʀ {} Orm, {} stiūp sinn, {} dræng gō[ða]n, {} ok {} vas {} farinn {} aus[t]r {} með {} Ingvari. {} Hialpi G[u]ð {} sālu h[a]ns. {}
"Gunnvaldr had this stone raised in memory of Ormr, his stepson, a good valiant man. And (he) travelled to the east with Ingvarr. May God help his soul."

== Östergötland ==
=== Ög 145 ===
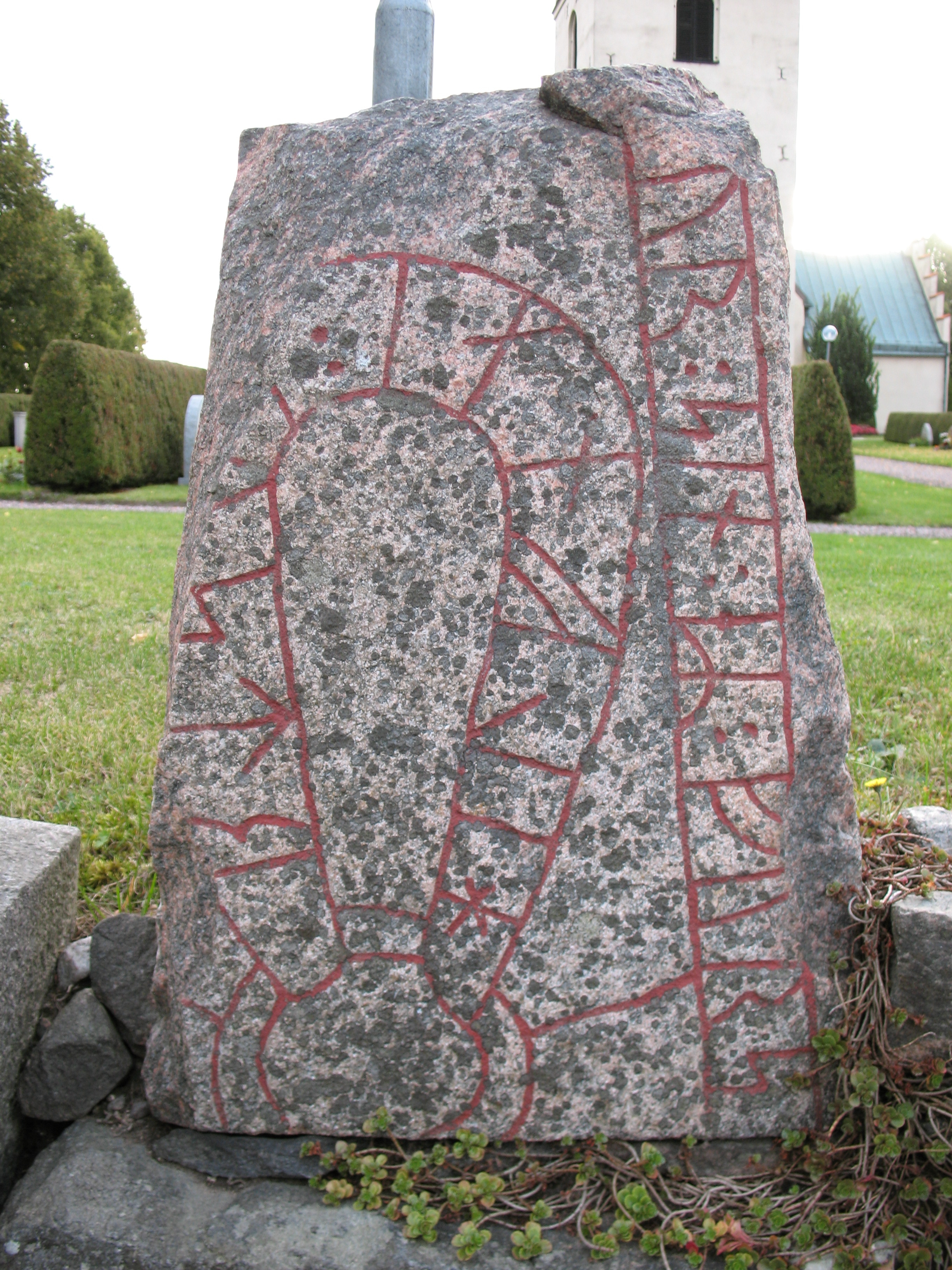
Runestone Ög 145

This stone is located at the church of Dagsberg.

ur : sin : eʀ : furs : ... hilfnai : (a)(u)str
[fað]ur/[brōð]ur {} sinn, {} eʀ {} fōrs {} ... hælfningi(?) {} austr.
"his father/ brother, who perished ... troop(?) in the east."

=== Ög 155 ===
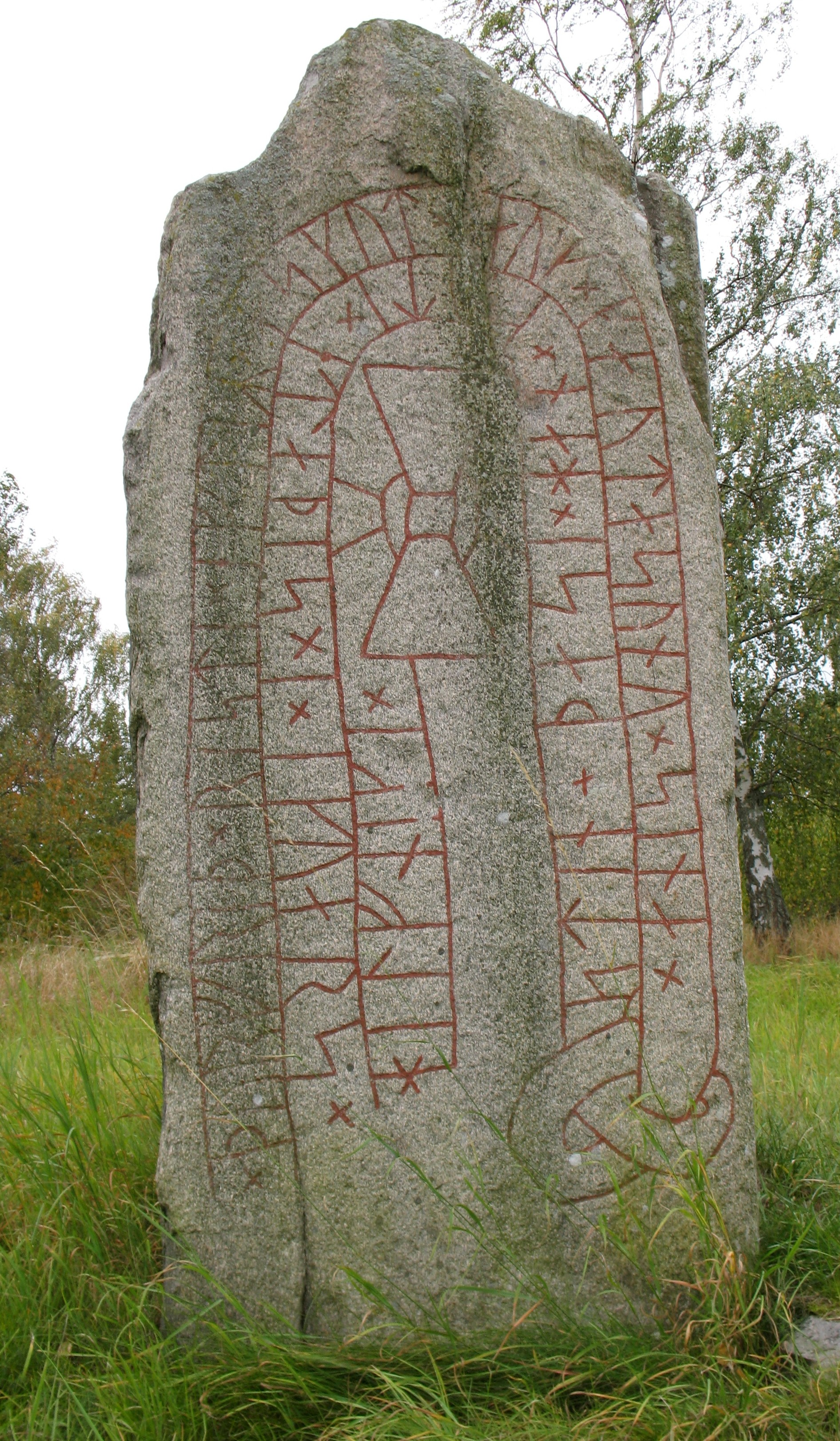
Runestone Ög 155

This stone is tentatively categorized as style RAK. It is located in Sylten, and it is the southernmost of the Ingvar runestones. It was known in the 17th century and a drawing by Johan Hadorph, Petrus Helgonius and Petrus Törnewall is preserved. Later, the stone was toppled and partially covered with soil. In 1896, it was re-erected by the owner of the homestead of Bjällbrunna and moved a small distance.

The word helfningr (appears in the dative case as the eastern dialectal form hælfningi) is originally a word for "half" but it could also mean "troop." It only appears in one additional runestone, which is located at the church of Dagsberg in Östergötland (see Ög 145).

The i-rune can represent both the i and the e phonemes, which means that the first name can be interpreted both as the woman's name Þorfríðr and the man's name Þorfreðr. It is consequently not known whether it was the mother or the father who raised the stone.

Ásgautr was a common name which appears in about 30 runic inscriptions. Gauti (modern Göte) was, however, rare in the runic inscriptions of the Viking Age and the only additional runestone where it appears is on U 516 (although damaged or unclear inscriptions on runestones Sö 14, G 65, and Norway's N 331 also have words translated as the name Gauti). It is believed to mean an inhabitant of Götaland, i.e. a Geat. The personal name element Gaut appears, however, in not only this part of Scandinavia but also in Svealand and in Denmark.

þurfriþ × risti × eftiʀ × askut × auk × kauta sunu × sina × stin × þasi × han × kuti × etaþis × i × ikuars × hilfniki ×
Þorfrīðr/Þorfreðr {} ræisti {} æftiʀ {} Āsgaut {} ok {} Gauta, sunu {} sina, {} stæin {} þannsi. {} Hann {} Gauti {} ændaðis {} ī {} Ingvars {} hælfningi. {}
"Þorfríðr/Þorfreðr raised this stone in memory of Ásgautr and Gauti, her/his sons. Gauti met his end in Ingvarr's troop."

== See also ==
- List of runestones

== Sources ==
- Andrén, Anders (2003). "The Meaning of Animal Art: An Interpretation of Scandinavian Rune-Stones". In Veit, Ulrich (ed.). Spuren und Botschaften: Interpretationen Materieller Kultur. Waxmann Verlag. ISBN 3-8309-1229-3.
- Cleasby, Richard; Vigfússon, Guðbrandur (1878). An Icelandic-English Dictionary. Clarendon Press.
- Ferguson, Robert (1883). Surnames as a Science. London: George Routledge & Sons.
- Fischer, Svante (1999). Ingvarsstenarna i tid och rum.
- Gräslund, Anne-Sofie (2003). "The Role of Scandinavian Women in Christianisation: The Neglected Evidence". In Carver, Martin (ed.). The Cross Goes North: Processes of Conversion in Northern Europe, AD 300–1300. Boydell Press. pp. 483–96. ISBN 1-903153-11-5.
- Gustavson, H. (1992). Runfynd 1989 och 1990, in Fornvännen Årgång 87. pp. 153–74.
- Jansson, Sven B. F. (1987). Runes In Sweden. Translated by Foote, Peter. Royal Academy of Letters. ISBN 91-7844-067-X.
- Jesch, Judith (2001). Ships and Men in the Late Viking Age: The Vocabulary of Runic Inscriptions and Skaldic Verse. Boydell Press. ISBN 0-85115-826-9.
- Larsson, Mats G. (1990). Ett Ödesdigert Vikingatåg. Ingvar den Vittfarnes resa 1036–1041 ISBN 91-7486-908-6
- Orchard, Andy (1997). Dictionary of Norse Myth and Legend. Cassell. ISBN 0-304-34520-2.
- Pritsak, Omeljan. (1981). The Origin of Rus'. Cambridge, Mass.: Distributed by Harvard University Press for the Harvard Ukrainian Research Institute. ISBN 0-674-64465-4
- Thunberg, Carl L. (2010). Ingvarståget och dess monument´. (Eng. "The Ingvar Expedition and its Monuments") ISBN 978-91-637-5724-2
- Thunberg, Carl L. (2011). Särkland och dess källmaterial. (Eng. "Serkland and its Source Material") ISBN 978-91-637-5727-3
- Tunstall, Peter (2005). The Saga of Yngvar the Traveller.
- Yonge, Charlotte Mary (1884). History of Christian Names. London: MacMillan & Company.
- An online presentation, where some the runestones are available with pictures.
- Rundata
