= Södermanland Runic Inscription 109 =

Swedish runic inscription

Coordinates: 59°22′30″N 16°32′44″E

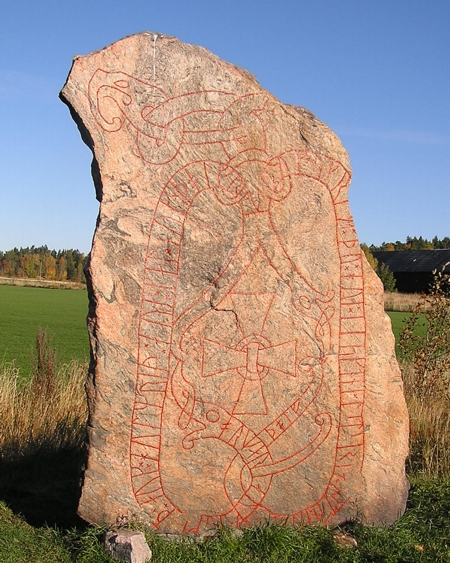
Runestone Sö 109 in Gredby, Sweden.

Sö 109 is the Rundata designation for a runic inscription on a Viking Age memorial runestone that is located in Gredby, which is near Eskilstuna, Södermanland County, Sweden, which was in the historic province of Södermanland.

== Description ==
This inscription consists of runic text in the younger futhark carved within two serpents that surround a Christian cross. The stone is 3.27 meters in height and composed of granite. The inscription is classified as being carved in runestone style Pr2, which is also known as Ringerike style.

The runestone was described in 1686 as being part of a bridge at Gredby. Before the historic significance of runestones was recognized, they were often re-used as materials in the construction of churches, bridges, and roads. In 1864 the stone was rediscovered and setup alongside the road, and then moved to its current location in 1931. It stands alongside two of the Ingvar runestones, Sö 107 and Sö 108.

The runic text states that a couple named Ormarr and Véfríðr and blood relatives raised the stone as a memorial to Þólfr.

== Inscription ==
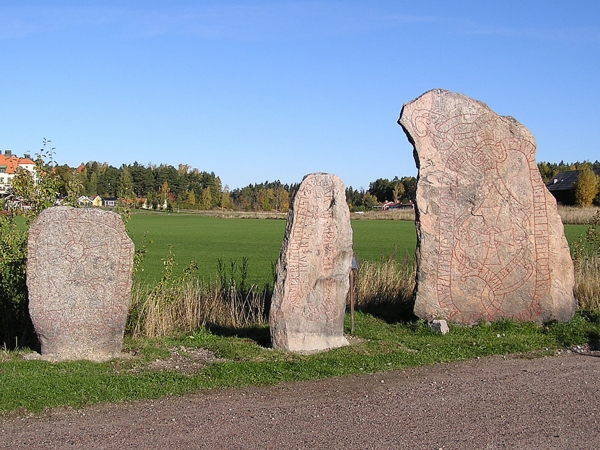
Runestones Sö 107, 108, and 109.

=== Transliteration of the runes into Latin characters ===
ormar auk × uifriþ ¤ auk × hulmriþ ¤ auk × kal ¤ auk ¤ þolfr auk ¤ (s)krim(i) ¤ þu ¤ hui ¤ --(s)keni ¤ litu (r)(s)(a) × stin × aftir þolf ×

=== Transcription into Old Norse ===
Ormarr ok Véfríðr ok Holmfríðr ok Káll(?) ok Þólfr ok Skrimi(?) þau hjún(?) [ok] [sy]stkin(?) létu reisa stein eptir Þólf.

=== Translation in English ===
Ormarr and Véfríðr and Holmfríðr and Káll(?) and Þolfr and Skrimi(?), this married couple(?) and siblings(?), they had the stone raised in memory of Þólfr.

== Runestone details ==
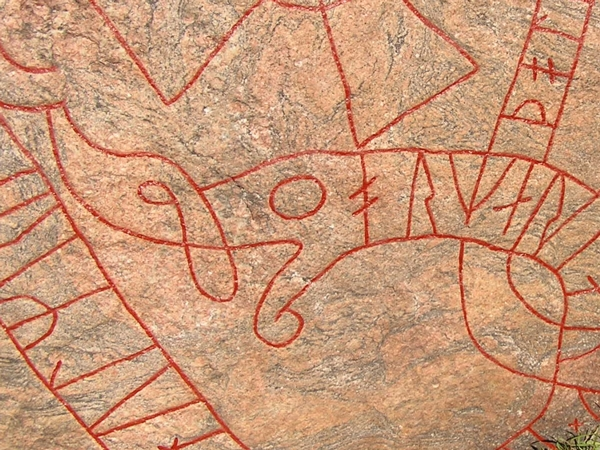
Serpent head with nose flap and start of text

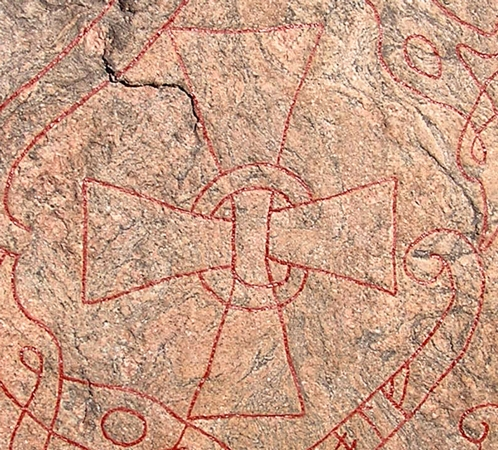
Central cross

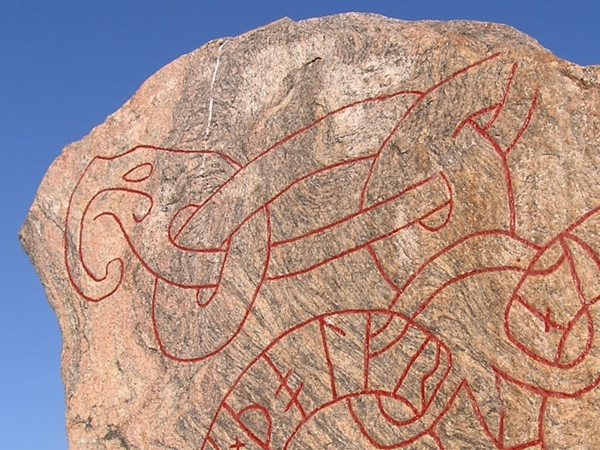
Endless serpent knot at top of stone

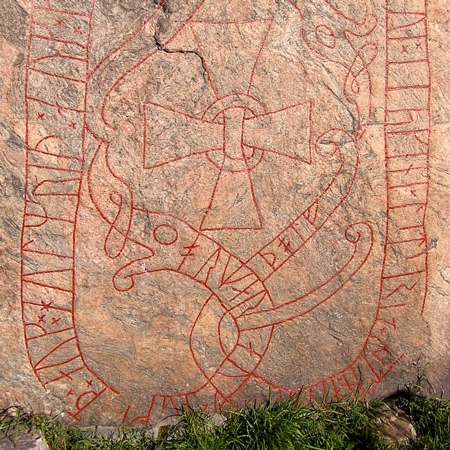
Lower section of stone
