= Södermanland Runic Inscription 178 =

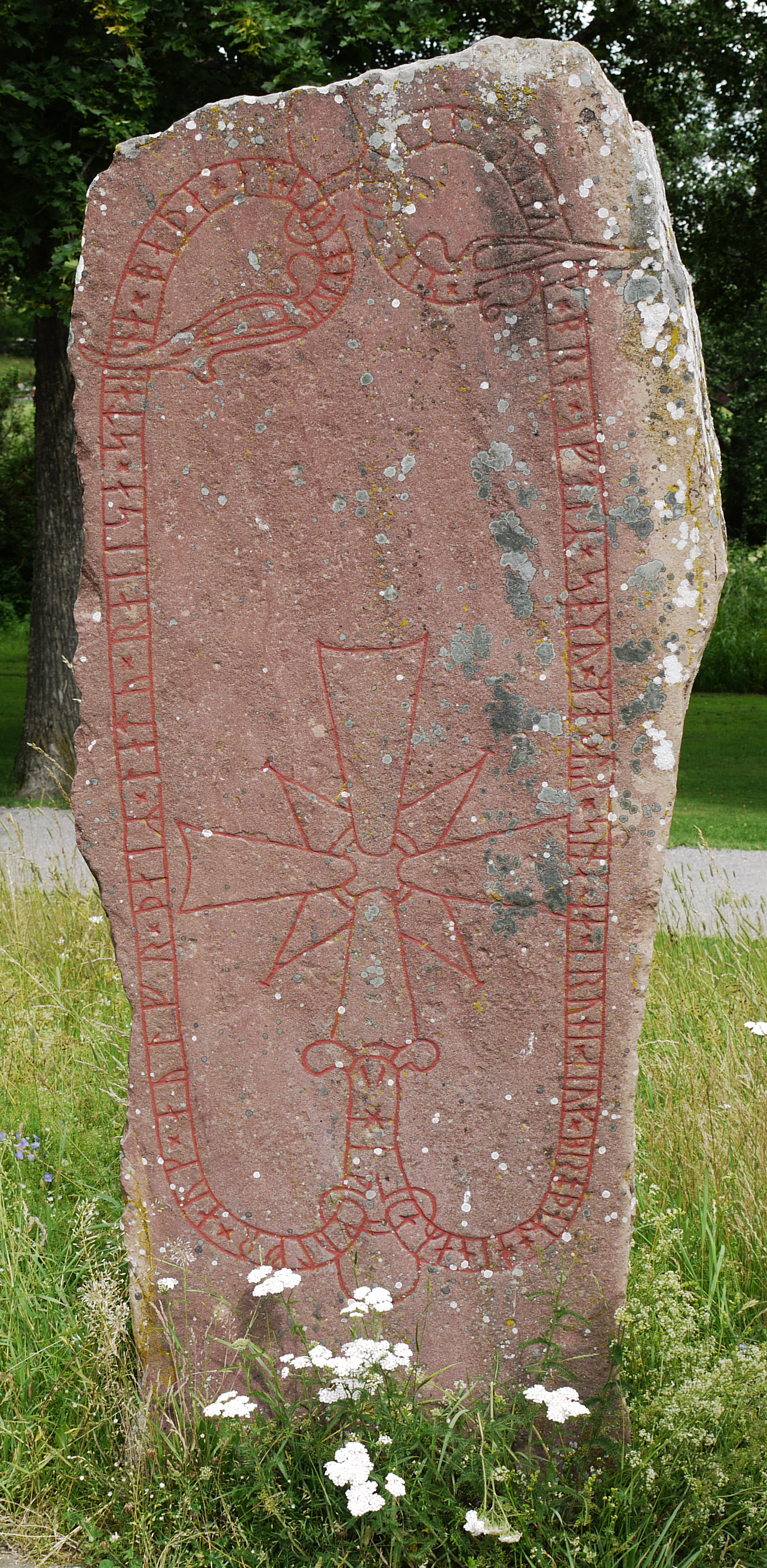
Sö 178 is located on the road at the entrance to Gripsholm castle.

Södermanland Runic Inscription 178 or Sö 178 is the Rundata catalog number for a Viking Age memorial runestone which is located at Gripsholm Castle, Södermanland County, Sweden, which is in the historic province of Södermanland.

== Description ==
This runestone, which is made of sandstone and is 1.9 meters in height, consists of runic text carved on two serpents that bracket a Christian cross. The serpents have binding at their heads and near the end of their tails as if to bind them to the stone. The inscription is classified as being carved in runestone style Pr4, which is also known as Urnes style. This runestone style is characterized by slim and stylized animals that are interwoven into tight patterns. The animal heads are typically seen in profile with slender almond-shaped eyes and upwardly curled appendages on the noses and the necks. The stone was discovered in 1730 during excavation work near the castle and moved to its current location in 1926. It is located near Sö 179 which is one of the Ingvar runestones.

The runic text states that two brothers named Helgulfr and Eyjulfr raised the stone as a memorial to their brother Ketilmundr and a bridge in memory of their mother Sóma. The use of the word "stones" indicates that the memorial once consisted of a second stone, which has been lost. The Old Norse word for bridge could also mean an embankment or ford. The reference to bridge-building is fairly common in runestones during this time period. Some are Christian references related to passing the bridge into the afterlife. At this time, the Catholic Church sponsored the building of roads and bridges through a practice similar to the use of indulgences in return for the church's intercession for the soul of the departed. There are over one hundred examples of bridge runestones that are dated from the eleventh century, including inscriptions Sö 101 in Ramsundsberget, U 489 in Morby, and U 617 in Bro. The first word of the runic text hikkulfr has a double k-rune. Since double consonants are rare in Viking Age runic inscriptions, if the first rune is considered to have been a carving error for an l-rune, the word would be the unusual name Helgulfr. Another possibility is that the word is the name Häggulv. The mother's name Sóma is otherwise unknown from this period, and may be related to the Old Norse word somi meaning "glory" or "honor."

The inscription is signed by a runemaster named Brúni, which is normalized as Brune, who was the brother of Sóma. The names of runemasters on many inscriptions are not located on the larger, main loop serpent with the main text, but are often on smaller serpents or adjacent to the main serpent. On Sö 178 Brune's name is on one of the two serpents with the main text, and that may be because he was related to the sponsors of the runestone. Brune also signed inscription Sö 55 in Bjudby, which is one of the England runestones, and the inscription Sö 177 from Kärnbo is attributed to him based upon stylistic analysis.

== Inscription ==
=== Transliteration of the runes into Latin characters ===
hikkulfr × auk × aulfr × þaiʀ × letu × raiisa × staina × baþa × at + broþur × sin × kitilmut * auk × bro × iftiʀ × somu × moþur × sina × ia × iruni × (h)iuk × broþiʀ + hinaʀ ×

=== Transcription into Old Norse ===
Hælgulfʀ(?)/Hægulfʀ(?) ok Øyulfʀ þæiʀ letu ræisa stæina baða at broður sinn Kætilmund ok bro æftiʀ Somu, moður sina. En Bruni(?) hiogg, broðiʀ hennaʀ.

=== Translation in English ===
Helgulfr(?) and Eyjulfr, they had both of the stones raised in memory of their brother Ketilmundr; and the bridge in memory of Sóma, their mother. And Brúni(?), her brother, cut.
