= Anthony Cleasby =

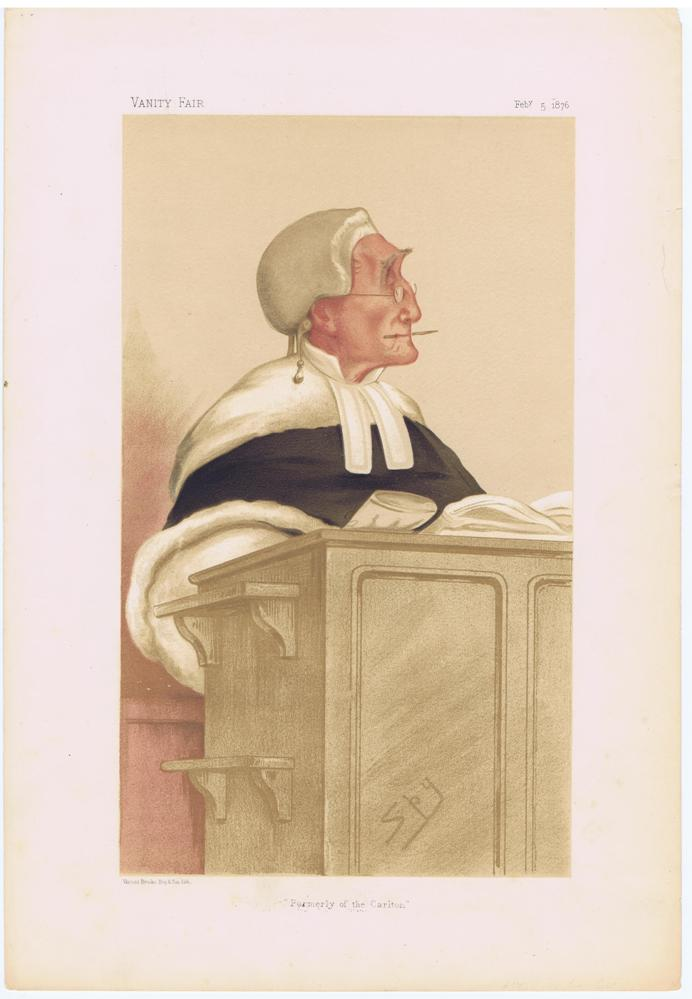
"Formerly of the Carlton" Cleasby as caricatured by Spy (Leslie Ward) in Vanity Fair, February 1876

Sir Anthony Cleasby (27 August 1804 – 6 October 1879) was a British judge.

== Life ==
Cleasby was the third son of Stephen Cleasby, a Russia broker, who carried on a prosperous business at 11 Union Court, Broad Street, in the city of London, and died at Craig House, Westmoreland, 31 August 1844; having married, 4 February 1797, at Stoke Newington, Mary, second daughter of George John of Penzance. His brother was the philologist Richard Cleasby.

Anthony was educated at Brook Green, Hammersmith, and then at Eton, 1820–3; he abandoned an intention of entering the army, because of an illness in 1819 which rendered him lame for life. He matriculated from Trinity College, Cambridge in October 1823, was third wrangler and B.A. in 1827, fellow of his college 1828, and M.A. 1830. He was admitted a student of the Inner Temple 30 January 1827, and called to the bar there 10 June 1831, and then went the Northern Circuit.

He soon became known as a most accurate and careful junior; he was a master of the science of special pleading and learned in all branches of the law. He was not, however, a successful nisi prius advocate, but obtained a large practice as a junior. His opinion was sought by commercial clients in patent cases, mercantile disputes, and real property cases.

In 1852 and again in 1859 he was an unsuccessful conservative candidate for East Surrey. He had previously purchased an estate called Ledgers, six miles east of Croydon. He was appointed a queen's counsel on 22 February 1861, and in the same year became a bencher of his inn. In February 1868 he contested the university of Cambridge without success against Alexander Beresford Hope.

Cleasby became a Baron of the Exchequer on 25 August 1868, was nominated a serjeant on the same day, admitted on 2 November, and on 9 December was knighted. As a judge he was so cautious and diffident that he won little popular applause. In the criminal courts he was never quite at home. The juries were puzzled by his extremely conscientious efforts to explain the whole law. In his written judgements, however, he spared no pains, and they were always thorough and exhaustive. He retired on a pension in October 1878; went to his country house, Penoyre, near Brecon, which he had purchased after his elevation to the bench; and died on 6 October 1879.

He married, on 26 March 1836, Lucy Susan, youngest daughter of Walter Fawkes of Farnley Hall, North Yorkshire.

== Arms ==
Coat of arms of Anthony Cleasby

Crest
On a mount Vert a demi-lion regardant Argent gorged with a collar Azure charged with three lozenges or and holding between the paws an escutcheon Gules thereon a whelk Argent.
Escutcheon
Ermine a lion passant Azure between two bendlets Gules on a chief Azure three lozenges Or.
