= Mark Clisby =

Australian lawyer, historian and writer

Mark Wallis Clisby is an Australian lawyer, author, journalist and military historian.

Born in South Australia, Clisby was educated at St Peter's College, Adelaide and graduated from the University of Adelaide with a Bachelor of Laws. He has also been awarded a Bachelor of Arts and an honours degree in history from the University of Adelaide. Clisby is also a qualified captain in the Royal Australian Infantry Corps.

Clisby gained some notoriety in 2002 when he was caught up in a public campaign by the then Minister for Immigration and Border Protection Philip Ruddock, the object of which was to eliminate migration appeals to the Australian Courts. As a consequence of this he was struck from the Migration Agent register.

Clisby is currently working on his second book which will be titled The Citizen's Tool Kit and will be a handbook on Australia's unique system of Government.

== Bibliography ==
- Guilty or Innocent - The Gordon Bennett Case, Allen and Unwin, Sydney, 1992, ISBN 978-1-86373-186-7
