= Södermanland Runic Inscription 360 =

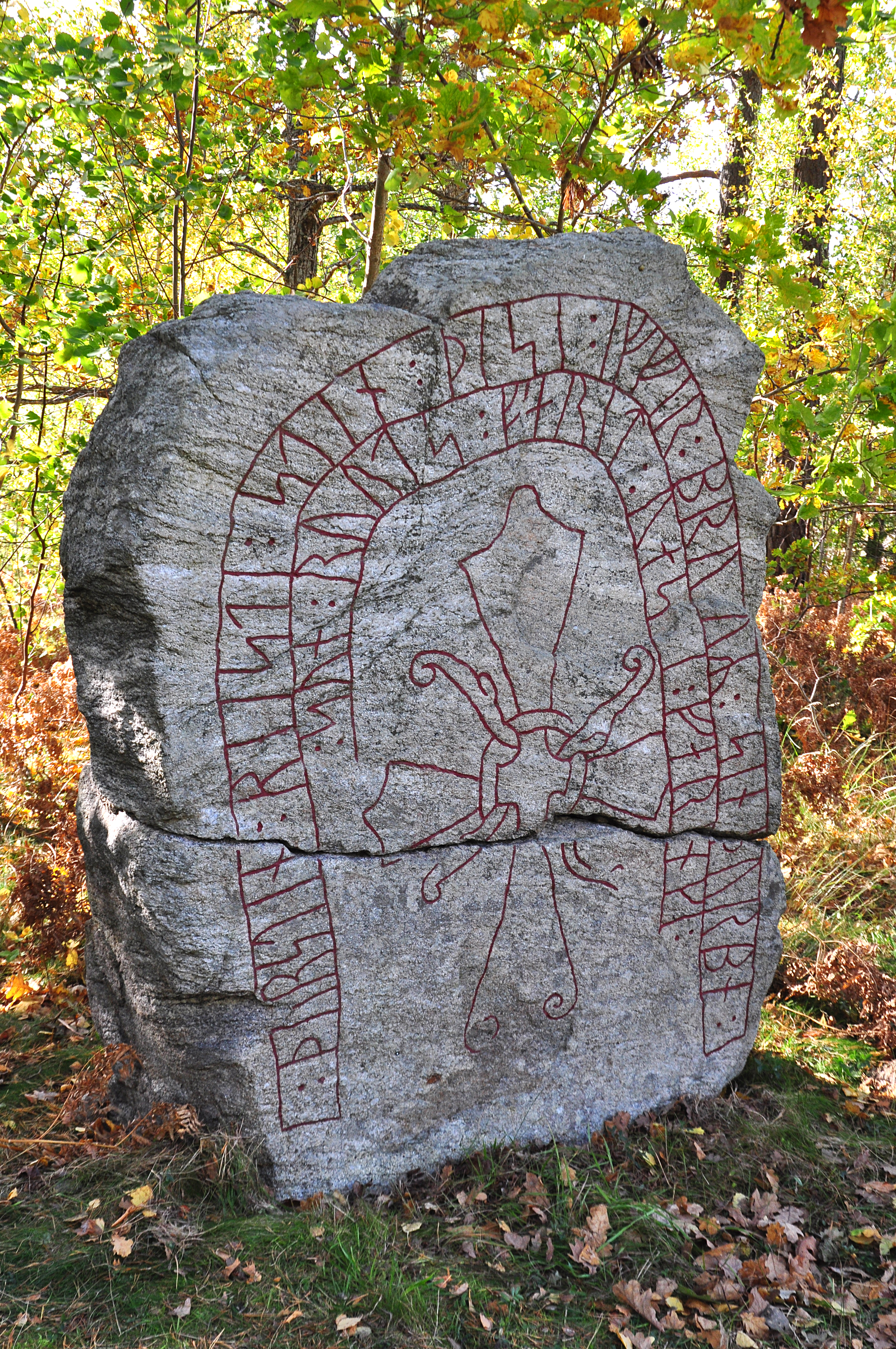

The Södermanland Runic Inscription 360 is a Viking Age runestone engraved in Old Norse with the Younger Futhark runic alphabet. It is located in Bjuddby, Blacksta, in Flen Municipality. The style of the runestone is categorized as RAK.

== Inscription ==
: þurstin : reisti : stin : þisi : iffir : bruuʀ : sin þurbn ·: sun : ru-ts : farit : uas i : far-nki :
{} Þorstæinn {} ræisti {} stæin {} þannsi {} æftiʀ {} broður {} sinn Þorbiorn, {} sun {} Ruts(?). {} Farinn {} vas i {} <far-nki>. {}
"Þorsteinn raised this stone in memory of his brother Þorbjôrn, Hrútr's(?) son. (He) had travelled ... "
