= Clasby =

Clasby is an Irish surname. Notable people with the surname include:

- Bob Clasby (born 1960), American football player
- John Clasby (1891–1932), Australian politician

== See also ==
- Cleasby (surname)
