= Richard Cleasby =

English philologist

Richard Cleasby (1797–1847) was an English philologist, author with Guðbrandur Vigfússon of the first Icelandic-English dictionary.

== Life ==
He was born on 30 November 1797, the eldest son of Stephen Cleasby, and the brother of Anthony Cleasby. He was educated at a private school, and for some years assisted his father in his business, but in 1824 gave up trade and went to the continent to study philosophy and literature. After spending four years principally in Italy and Germany, he returned for a winter's term at the University of Edinburgh, went again to the continent, and eventually settled in 1830 at Munich to study philosophy under Friedrich Schelling and Old German under Johann Andreas Schmeller and Hans Ferdinand Massmann. He made excursions into many districts of Germany, gaining a knowledge of German dialects.

A liver complaint often sent him to Carlsbad, and he occasionally revisited England. His first visit to Denmark and Sweden was in May 1834, and he became attracted by Scandinavian subjects. In 1839 he collated the Codex Argenteus at Uppsala, and in January 1840 he formed the plan of his Icelandic-English Dictionary, starting work by April. He worked while travelling between England, German spas, and Copenhagen, where he had amanuenses. In the summer of 1847 his health grew worse, and on 6 October he died of an attack of typhoid fever.

The poetical vocabulary, prepared under his direction by Sveinbjörn Egilsson, was ready for publication in 1846. In the following year Cleasby had set up in type specimens of the prose dictionary. Arrangements were made for the completion of the work at Copenhagen. After some false starts and the temporary loss of some of Cleasby's papers, Guðbrandur Vigfússon in 1864 took over the Dictionary, and George Webbe Dasent lobbied the Clarendon Press for backing. The work was eventually completed in 1873, and published with a preface by Henry Liddell, and an introduction and memoir of Cleasby by Dasent.
