= Lists of people by occupation =

This is a list of lists of people by occupation. Each is linked to a list of notable people within that profession.

== Lists of lists ==
- Actors
  - Star Wars actors
- Actresses
- Architects
- Artists
- Astronauts
- Engineers
- Journalists
- Kickboxers
- Mathematicians
- Musicians
- Office Holders
  - Lists of office-holders of the United States
- Painters
- Philosophers
- List of photographers
- Playboy models
- Professional bodybuilders
- Scientists
- Lists of screenwriters
- Sculptors
- Lists of sportspeople
  - Pro Bowl players
  - Oldest cricketers
- List of television reporters
  - List of current BBC newsreaders and reporters
  - List of former BBC newsreaders and reporters

== List of... ==
- Accordionists
- Africanists
- Anthropologists
- Archaeologists
- Archivists
- Astronomers and astrophysicists
- Au pairs
- Aviators
- Biochemists
- Biographers
- Biologists
- Botanists
- Business theorists
- Cardiologists
- Caricaturists
- Cartographers
- Cartoonists
- Censors
- Centenarians
- Child actors
- Chefs
- Chemists
- Chess grandmasters
- Chess players
- Chief executive officers
- Choreographers
- Christian theologians
- Civil rights leaders
- Climbers
- Clinical psychologists
- Clowns
- Club DJs
- Coleopterists
- Comedians
- Comic creators
- Composers
- Computer scientists
- Copywriters
- Cosmologists
- Crime bosses
- Criminal justice academics
- Critical theorists
- Critics
- Cryptographers
- Dance personalities
- Dancers
- Dentists
- Dermatologists
- Directors
- Economists
- Entomologists
- Entrepreneurs
- Essayists
- Ethicists
- Explorers
- Fashion designers
- Feminist economists
- Feminists
- Footwear designers
- Game designers
- Gardeners
- Geneticists
- Geographers
- Geologists
- Geometers
- Geophysicists
- Graphic designers
- Guerrillas
- Hackers
- Herpetologists
- Historians
- Humorists
- Illustrators
- Internet entrepreneurs
- Inventors
- Jurists
- Landscape architects
- Lexicographers
- Librarians
- Linguists
- Logicians
- Luthiers
- Magicians
- Marine biologists
- Maritime explorers
- Mathematical probabilists
- Media proprietors
- Meteorologists
- Military writers
- Mineralogists
- Musicologists
- Neurochemists
- Neurologists
- Neuroscientists
- News presenters
- Newspaper columnists
- Novelists by nationality
- Nurses
- Oenologists
- Ornithologists
- Paleontologists
- Patent attorneys
- Pathologists
- Pharmacists
- Philanthropists
- Philatelists
- Photochemists
- Photojournalists
- Physicians
- Physicists
- Pirates
- Playwrights
- Poets
- Political scientists (Note: An article about the occupation that includes a list of practitioners.)
- Political theorists
- Porn stars
- Programmers
- Psephologists
- Psychoanalytical theorists
- Psychologists
- Railroad executives
- Rheologists
- Role-playing game designers
- Runologists
- Russian earth scientists
- Sailors
- School counselors
- Sea captains
- Show business families
- Singer-songwriters
- Soap-makers
- Social psychologists
- Social theorists
- Sociologists
- Soil scientists
- Sports announcers
- Sportsmen
- Stand-up comedians
- Statisticians
- Strippers
- Studio potters
- Syndicated columnists
- Talk show hosts
- Tattoo artists
- Telegraphists
- Televangelists
- Television presenters
- Theatre directors
- Theoretical Physicists
- Translators
- Ufologists
- Undersea explorers
- Urban planners
- Veterinarians
- Vexillologists
- Video game designers
- Woodcarvers
- Woodturners
- Writers
- YouTubers
