= Sveriges runinskrifter =

Catalogue of Swedish rune inscriptions

Sveriges runinskrifter (English: "Sweden's rune inscriptions", ISSN 0562-8016) is a multi-volume catalog of rune inscriptions found in various Swedish provinces. The earliest volume of this ongoing series dates to 1900, and, by 1981, 15 volumes had been published.

Sveriges runinskrifter established the standard cataloging system for Swedish rune inscriptions. Each inscription is identified by a province code and a catalog number. For example:

- U 11 - Uppland rune inscription 11
- Ög 179 - Östergötland rune inscription 179

Today, this cataloging system is used by electronic databases such as Rundata and commonly seen in scholarly publications. This cataloging system has also been imitated and extended by scholars in other countries.

== See also ==
- Bautil
- List of runestones
- Runic alphabet
- Runestone
- Rundata
