= Ovansjö Runestones =

Viking Age runestones found in Sweden

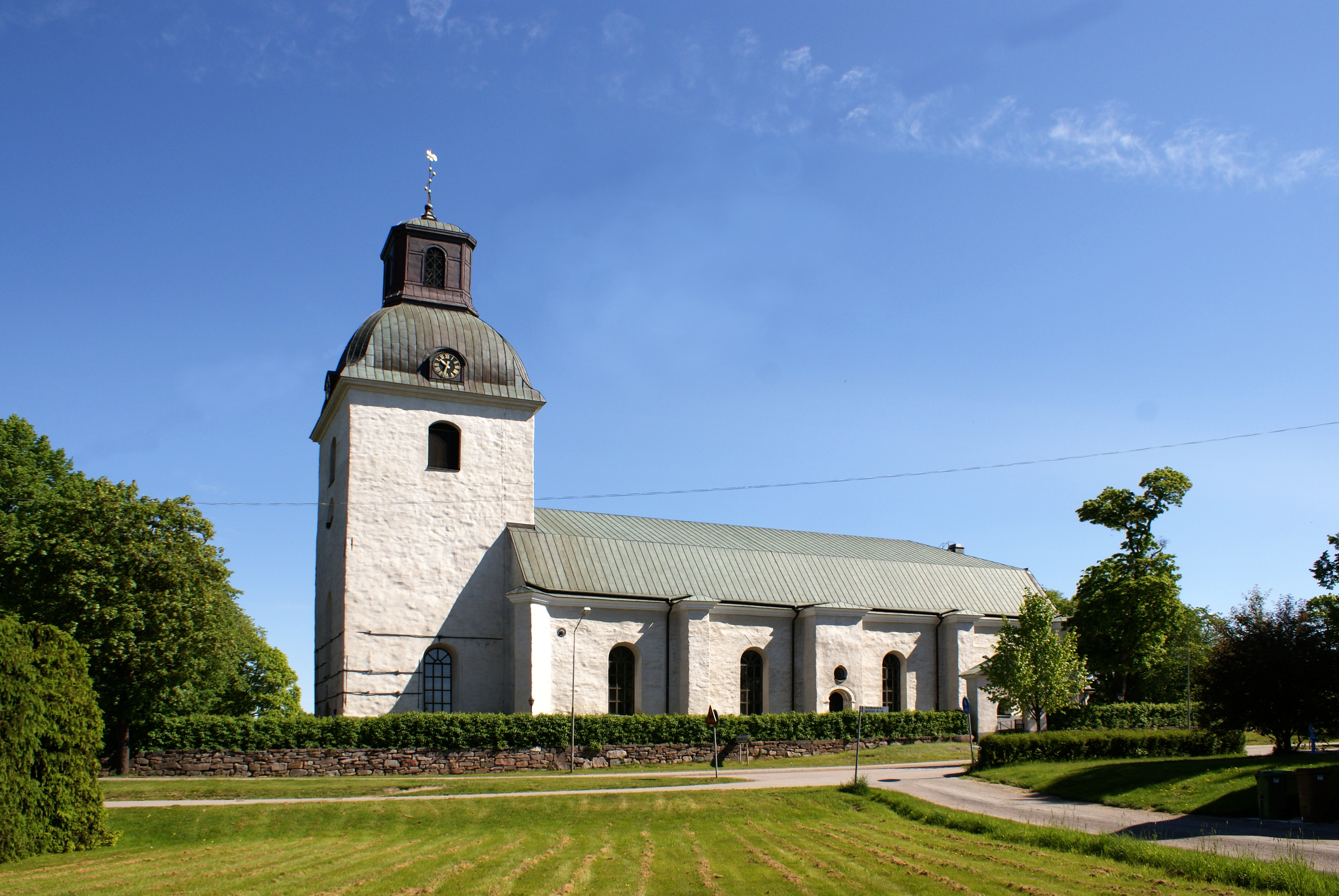
The church at Ovansjö.

The Ovansjö Runestones are two Viking Age memorial runestones and fragments of a third that were found in a church in Ovansjö, which is east of Kungsgården, Gävleborg County, Sweden, which was in the historic province of Gästrikland.

== Gs 14 ==
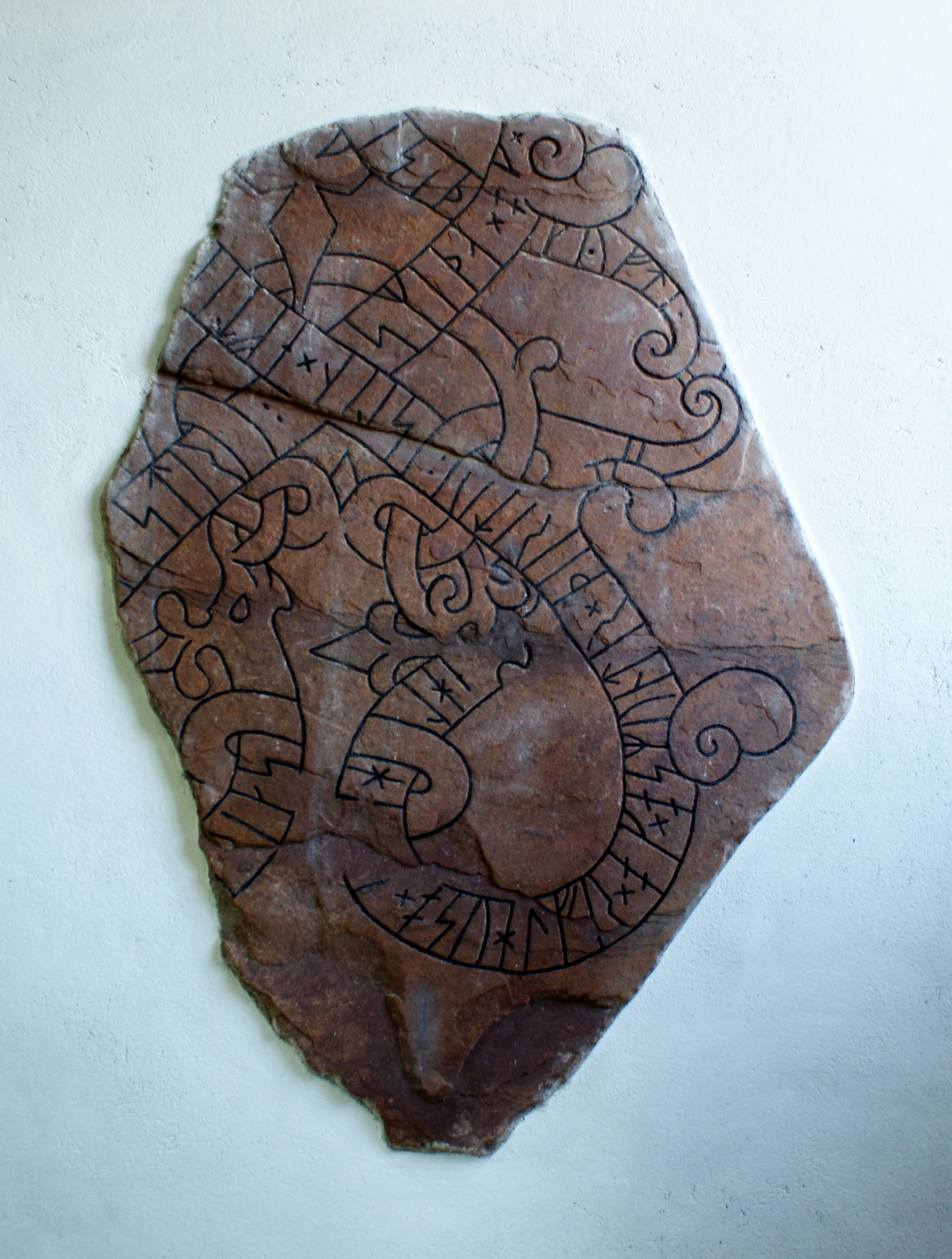
Gs 14.

Gästrikland Runic Inscription 14 or Gs 14 is the Rundata catalog number for a damaged sandstone runestone, which is 1.75 by 1.25 meters, that was discovered in the eastern wall near the entrance to the nave of the church. Before the historic significance of runestones was understood, they were often re-used in the construction of bridges, walls, and buildings such as churches. The inscription is classified as being carved in runestone style Pr1, which is also known as Ringerike style. This is the classification for inscriptions with text bands that have attached serpent heads depicted as seen in profile, but with features that are not as stylized as those in Urnes style.

The partial runic text names the three sponsors of the memorial stone, Helgi and Ásulfr and Ásmundr, but the name of the deceased has been lost. The text does state that the deceased man, who was probably the father of the sponsors, was bæztr smiða or the "best of smiths." This is the only surviving runestone that mentions that a person was a blacksmith. Gästrikland is known to have been a center of ironmaking during the Viking Age. One rule followed in craving runes in stone was that two consecutive identical letters were represented by a single rune, even when the two identical letters end one word and start a second word. In Gs 14, the runes þiritu are transcribed below as þir| |ritu to designate that a single r-rune was used this way in two consecutive words. The runemaster also transposed the first two runes in ehlhi for the name Helgi.

=== Inscription ===
==== Transliteration of the runes into Latin characters ====
ehlhi ...- × osuhlfr × ok × osmuntr × þir| |ritu : s(t)in × efti(r) ... ...is-þ kyfti * sa(r) -... ...--str : smiþa × ok × ...

==== Transcription into Old Norse ====
Hælgi [ok] Asulfʀ ok Asmundr þæiʀ rettu stæin æftiʀ ... ... køpti(?). Saʀ [vaʀ(?)] [bæ]ztr(?) smiða ok ...

==== Translation in English ====
Helgi and Ásulfr and Ásmundr, they erected the stone in memory of ... ... bought(?) He was(?) the best(?) of smiths and ...

== Gs 15 ==
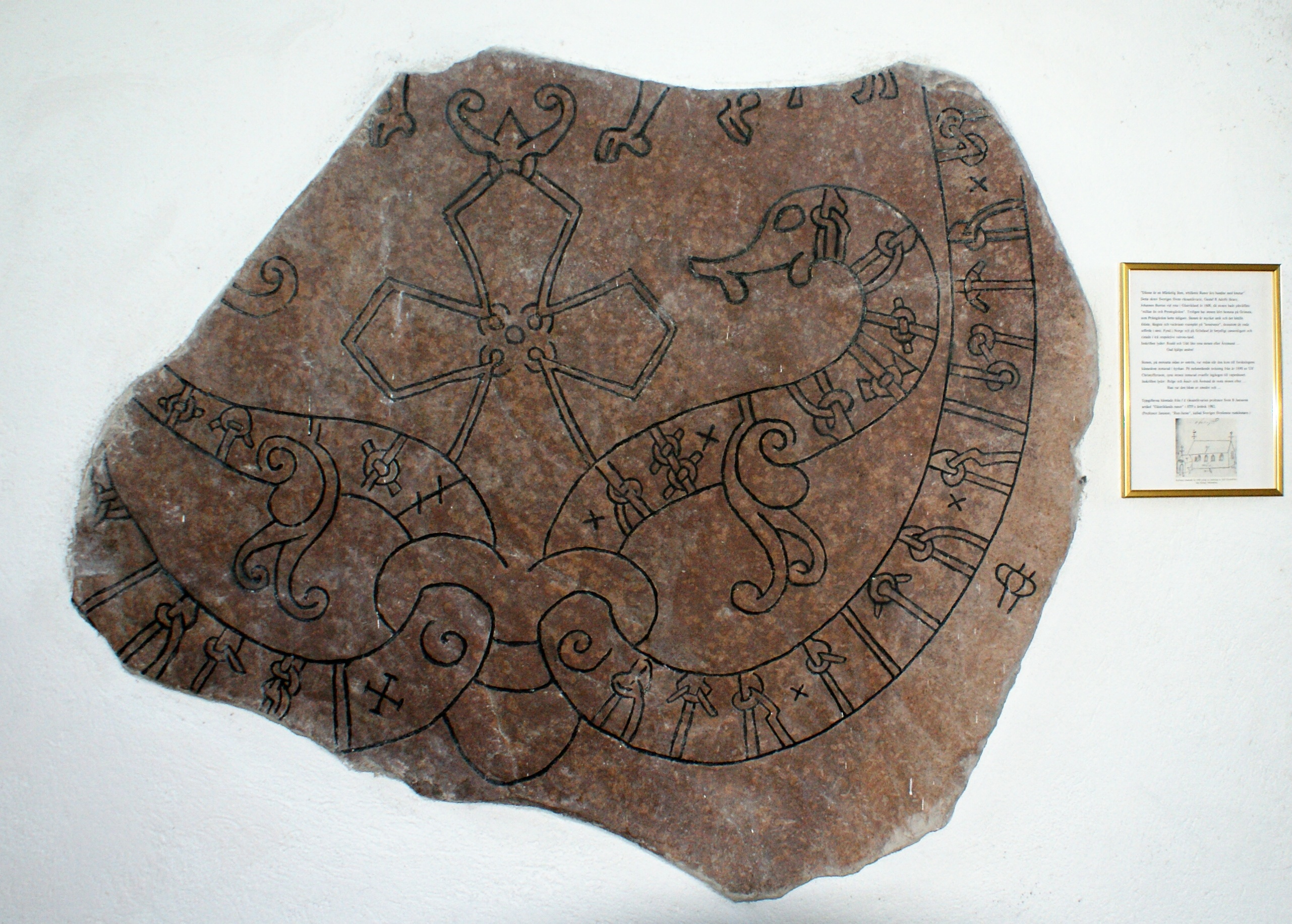
Gs 15 with its knot runes.

Gästrikland Runic Inscription 15 or Gs 15 is the Rundata designation for a damaged sandstone runestone measuring 1.3 by 1.0 meters that was also found in the eastern wall of the church near the nave. The inscription is classified as being carved in runestone style Pr2, which is also known as Ringerike style. The serpent heads in Pr2 inscriptions are more stylized than those classified as Pr1. The runes on Gs 15 are intricately carved as looped pieces of string that have been described by Swedish runologists as knutrunor or "knot runes." This is the only Viking Age inscription that uses knot runes, but two inscriptions from Greenland, GR 64 from Narsarsuaq and GR NOR1999;7 from Sandet, and a stick from Bergen which are all dated from the Medieval period also use knot runes.

The runic text states that the stone was raised by Hróaldr and Oddr as a memorial to Ernmundr. The runes for Hróaldr contain a bind rune which is a ligature that combines an l-rune and t-rune into a single rune. It has been suggested that the bind rune was used because an error had initially been made in the spelling of that name where the l-rune was initially omitted. However, it was also common to use bind runes to ornament and highlight names.

=== Inscription ===
==== Transliteration of the runes into Latin characters ====
rual=tr × ok × utr × litu × restu × s[(t)en × eftr × irm...] ... ...þ [×] iulbi × onta ...[o(n) × litsi(a)]

==== Transcription into Old Norse ====
Hroaldr ok Uddr letu ræistu stæin æftiʀ Ærnm[und] ... [Gu]ð hialpi anda ... <litsia>.

==== Translation in English ====
Hróaldr and Oddr had the stone raised in memory of Ernmundr ... May God help (his) spirit ...

== Gs 16 ==
Two fragments that were part of a single runestone have been designated as Gästrikland Runic Inscription 16. The larger fragment was discovered in 1928 during deep plowing of the churchyard. The partial inscription indicates the stone was raised as a memorial to a man probably named Sigbjôrn. A bind rune was used in the word rista ("carved") which combines the s-rune and t-rune.

=== Inscription ===
==== Transliteration of the runes into Latin characters ====
A ... (e)ftiʀ ÷ sihbi... ... ...s=ta lit ÷ biu-... ...
B [...- þana ÷ ...]

==== Transcription into Old Norse ====
A ... æftiʀ Sigbi[orn] ... [ri]sta let Bio[rn] ...
B ... þenna ...

==== Translation in English ====
A ... in memory of Sigbjôrn ... Bjôrn had carved ...
B ... this ...

== See also ==
- List of runestones
