= Theodor Grotthuss =

German chemist (1785–1822)

Freiherr Christian Johann Dietrich Theodor von Grotthuß
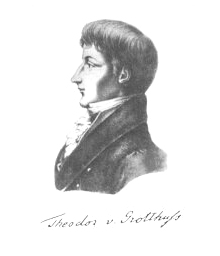
- Theodor von Grotthuß
- Born: 20 January 1785; Leipzig, Electorate of Saxony, Holy Roman Empire
- Died: 26 March 1822 (aged 37); Geddutz, Russian Empire (now Gedučiai, Lithuania)
- Education: École Polytechnique
- Known for: Explanation of electrolysis by the Grotthuss mechanism
- Scientific career
- Fields: Electrochemistry, photochemistry

Freiherr Christian Johann Dietrich Theodor von Grotthuss (20 January 1785 – 26 March 1822) was a Baltic German scientist known for establishing the first theory of electrolysis in 1806 and formulating the first law of photochemistry in 1817. His theory of electrolysis is considered the first description of the so-called Grotthuss mechanism.

== Life and work ==
Protons are transferred across a series of hydrogen bonds between hydronium ions and water molecules.

Grotthuss was born in 1785 in Leipzig, Electorate of Saxony, Holy Roman Empire, during an extended stay of his parents away from their home in northern Grand Duchy of Lithuania. He showed interest in natural sciences and went to study first in Leipzig and later in Paris at the École Polytechnique. Several renowned scientists taught at the École Polytechnique at that time, including Antoine François, comte de Fourcroy, Claude Louis Berthollet and Louis Nicolas Vauquelin.

Because of some tensions in the relations between Russia and France, Grotthuss had to leave for Italy where he stayed at Naples for one year. The discovery of the first electric cell in 1800 by Alessandro Volta provided the scientists a source of electricity which was used in various laboratory experiments around Europe. The electrolysis of water, acids and salt solutions was reported, but a good explanation was missing. Grotthuss actively contributed to this area both in terms of electrolysis experiments and their interpretation. During his stay in Italy, he published his work on electrolysis in 1806. His idea that the charge is not transported by the movement of particles but by breaking and reformation of bonds was the first basically correct concept for the charge transport in electrolytes; it is still valid for the charge transport in water, and the current proton hopping mechanism is a modified version of the original Grotthuss mechanism.

The following two years Grotthuss spent in Rome, some other Italian cities, and Paris, and then went back to Russia via Munich and Vienna. From 1808 on he lived at the estate of his mother in northern Lithuania. There he conducted research on electricity and light with the limited research equipment he could assemble. Grotthuss committed suicide in the spring of 1822 during a depression caused by health problems.

== See also ==
- Grotthuss–Draper law
- List of photochemists

== Sources ==
- "Гротгус, Христиан-Иоганн-Дитрих" . Brockhaus and Efron Encyclopedic Dictionary (in Russian). 1906.
