= Photochemical logic gate =

A photochemical logic gate is based on the photochemical intersystem crossing and molecular electronic transition between photochemically active molecules, leading to logic gates that can be produced.

== The OR gate electron–photon transfer chain ==
_A*                    A* = excited state of molecule A 
     _B*
          _C*

_A   _B   _C

The OR gate is based on the activation of molecule A, and thus pass electron / photon to molecule C's excited state orbitals (C*). The electron from molecule A inter system crosses to C* via the excited state orbitals of B, eventually utilised as a signal in the C* hν_{c} emission. The 'OR' gate uses two inputs of light (photons) to molecule A in two separate electron transfer chains, both of which are capable of transferring to C* and thus producing the output of an OR gate. Therefore, if either electron transfer chain is activated, molecule C's excitation produces a valid/ output emission.

Input   Input
A           D
 ↘        ↙
  B      E
     ↘↙
     C
   output

== The 'AND' gate ==
            _C**     Second excited state of molecule C
_A*
      _B*
            _C*
  
_A    _B    _C

Excitation A→A* by hν_{a} photon, whereby the promoted electron is passed down to the C* molecular orbital. A second photon applied to the system (hν_{c2}) causes the excitation of the electron in the C* molecular orbital to the C** molecular orbital -analogous pump probe spectroscopy.

_** Second excited state of molecule C
↑hν_{c2}
_*
↑hν_{c}
_C

Above, the energy level diagram illustrating the principle of pump probe spectroscopy –the excitation of an excited state. The AND gate is produced by the necessity of both A→A* and the C**→C excitations occurring at the same time -input hν and hν, are simultaneously required. To prevent erroneous emissions of light from a single input to the AND gate, it would be necessary to have an electron transfer series with ability accept any electrons (energy) from C* energy level. The electron transfer series would terminate with a low (non-radiative decay) of the energy The alternatives for producing an AND gate, using molecular photphysics, are two. (1) The emission produced by the electron drop from C*→C (hν_{c}) is not a valid output frequency. The emission from the C** (hν_{c} + hν_{c2}, hν_{c3}) molecular orbital is a valid output signal;. to be used in subsequent logic gates -arranged to respond to the $C^{**} \xrightarrow[c2]{} C$ emission. The second input of photon(s) to trigger the rapid conversion of a molecule used to complete the electron transfer chain. A very complex molecule like a protein can be engineered to possess high strain energies, so that in the absence of the second light frequency molecule B is inactive (B). The second photon input triggers B→B' where the forward rate constant is much smaller than the reverse. If such a molecule is used as molecule B, the transfer chain can be switched on and off.

== Creating the NOT gate ==
To stop the electron transfer chain completing, producing output signals, the input of a photon, hν_{c2}, is used to produce a 'pump probe spectroscopy' effect by promoting an electron in an electron transfer chain. The fall of the pump probe promoted electron produces an output that is quenched down an electron transfer chain.

An alternative is similar to the AND gate alternative; an input causes a change in molecule structure breaking the electron transfer chain by not allowing the smooth energy transfer of electrons.

== See also ==
- Photochemistry
  - Photochemical reaction
  - Photohydrogen
  - Photocatalysis
  - Photodissociation
  - Photoelectrolysis
  - Photosynthesis
    - Artificial photosynthesis
