= Photochemistry =

Sub-discipline of chemistry

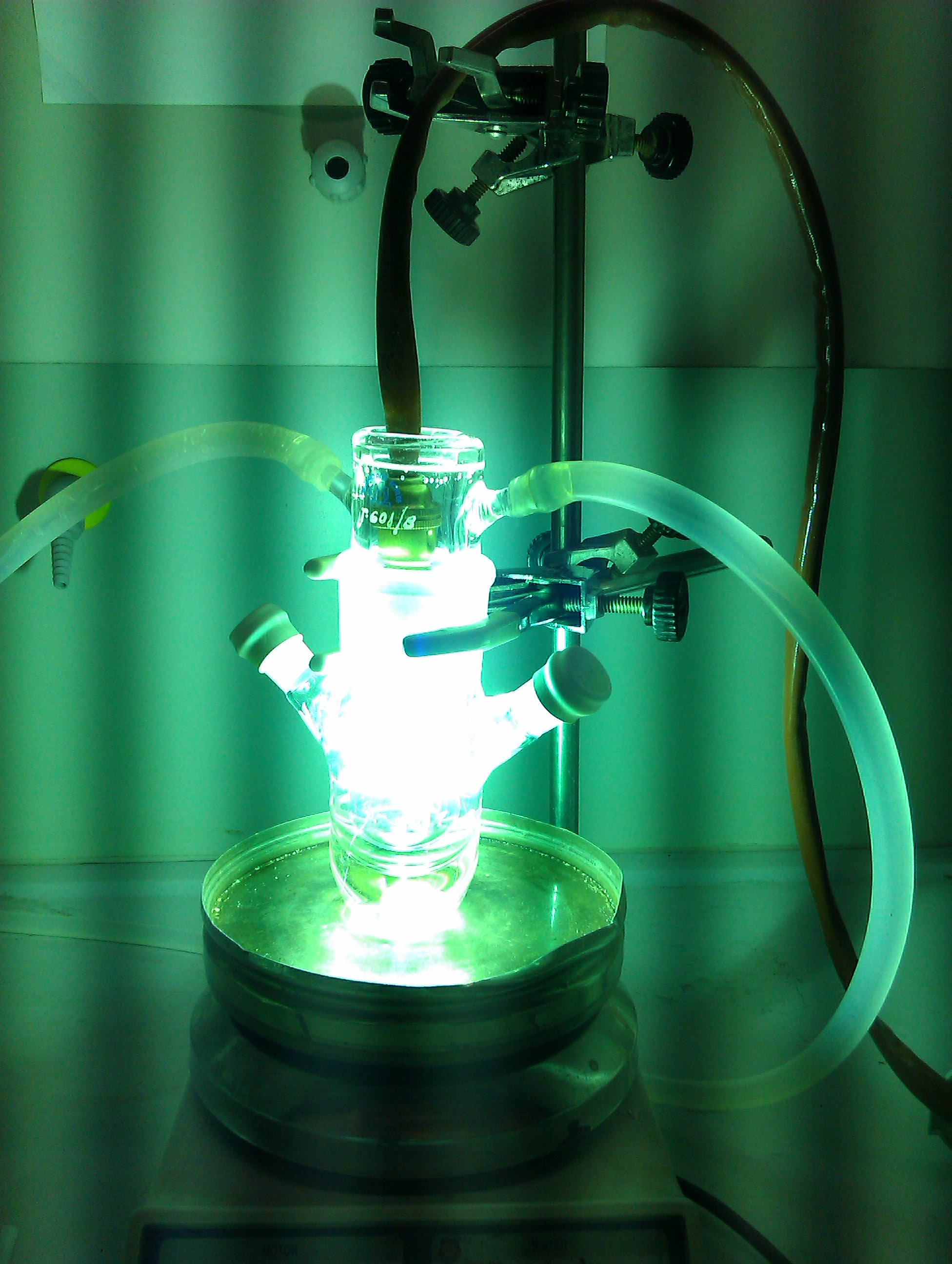
Photochemical immersion well reactor (50 mL) with a mercury-vapor lamp

Photochemistry is the branch of chemistry concerned with the chemical effects of light. Generally, this term is used to describe a chemical reaction caused by absorption of ultraviolet (wavelength from 100 to 400 nm), visible (400–750 nm), or infrared radiation (750–2500 nm). A specialization of this branch at the nanoscale is nanophotochemistry.

In nature, photochemistry is of immense importance as it is the basis of photosynthesis, vision, and the formation of vitamin D with sunlight. It is also responsible for the appearance of DNA mutations leading to skin cancers.

Photochemical reactions proceed differently than temperature-driven reactions. Photochemical paths access high-energy intermediates that cannot be generated thermally, thereby overcoming large activation barriers in a short period of time, and allowing reactions otherwise inaccessible by thermal processes. Photochemistry can also be destructive, as illustrated by the photodegradation of plastics.

== Concepts ==
Photoexcitation is the first step in a photochemical process: the reactant is elevated to a state of higher energy, an excited state.

=== Grotthuss–Draper law and Stark–Einstein law ===
The first law of photochemistry, known as the Grotthuss–Draper law (for chemists Theodor Grotthuss and John W. Draper), states that light must be absorbed by a chemical substance in order for a photochemical reaction to take place. According to the second law of photochemistry, known as the Stark–Einstein law (for physicists Johannes Stark and Albert Einstein), for each photon of light absorbed by a chemical system, no more than one molecule is activated for a photochemical reaction, as defined by the quantum yield.

=== Fluorescence and phosphorescence ===
When a substance in its ground state (S_{0}) absorbs light, one electron is excited. This electron maintains its spin. According to the spin selection rule; other transitions would violate the law of conservation of angular momentum. The excitation to a higher singlet state can be from HOMO to LUMO or to a higher orbital, so that singlet excitation states S_{1}, S_{2}, S_{3}... at different energies are possible.

Kasha's rule stipulates that higher singlet states quickly relax by radiationless decay or internal conversion (IC) to S_{1}. Thus, S_{1} is usually, but not always, the only relevant singlet excited state. This excited state S_{1} can further relax to S_{0} by IC, but also by an allowed radiative transition from S_{1} to S_{0} that emits a photon; this process is called fluorescence.

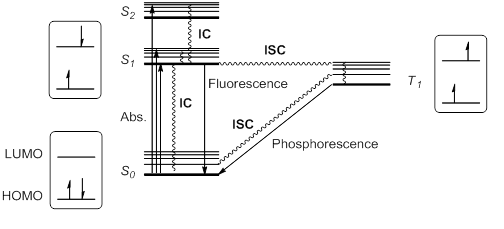
Jablonski diagram. Radiative paths are represented by straight arrows and non-radiative paths by curly lines.

Alternatively, it is possible for the excited state S_{1} to undergo spin inversion and to generate a triplet excited state T_{1} having two unpaired electrons with the same spin. This violation of the spin selection rule is possible by intersystem crossing (ISC) of the vibrational and electronic levels of S_{1} and T_{1}. According to Hund's rule of maximum multiplicity, this T_{1} state would be somewhat more stable than S_{1}.

This triplet state can relax to the ground state S_{0} by radiationless ISC or by a radiation pathway called phosphorescence. This process implies a change of electronic spin, which is forbidden by spin selection rules, making phosphorescence (from T_{1} to S_{0}) much slower than fluorescence (from S_{1} to S_{0}). Thus, triplet states generally have longer lifetimes than singlet states. These transitions are usually summarized in a state energy diagram or Jablonski diagram, the paradigm of molecular photochemistry.

These excited species, either S_{1} or T_{1}, have a half-empty low-energy orbital, and are consequently more oxidizing than the ground state. But at the same time, they have an electron in a high-energy orbital, and are thus more reducing. In general, excited species are prone to participate in electron transfer processes.

=== Experimental setup ===
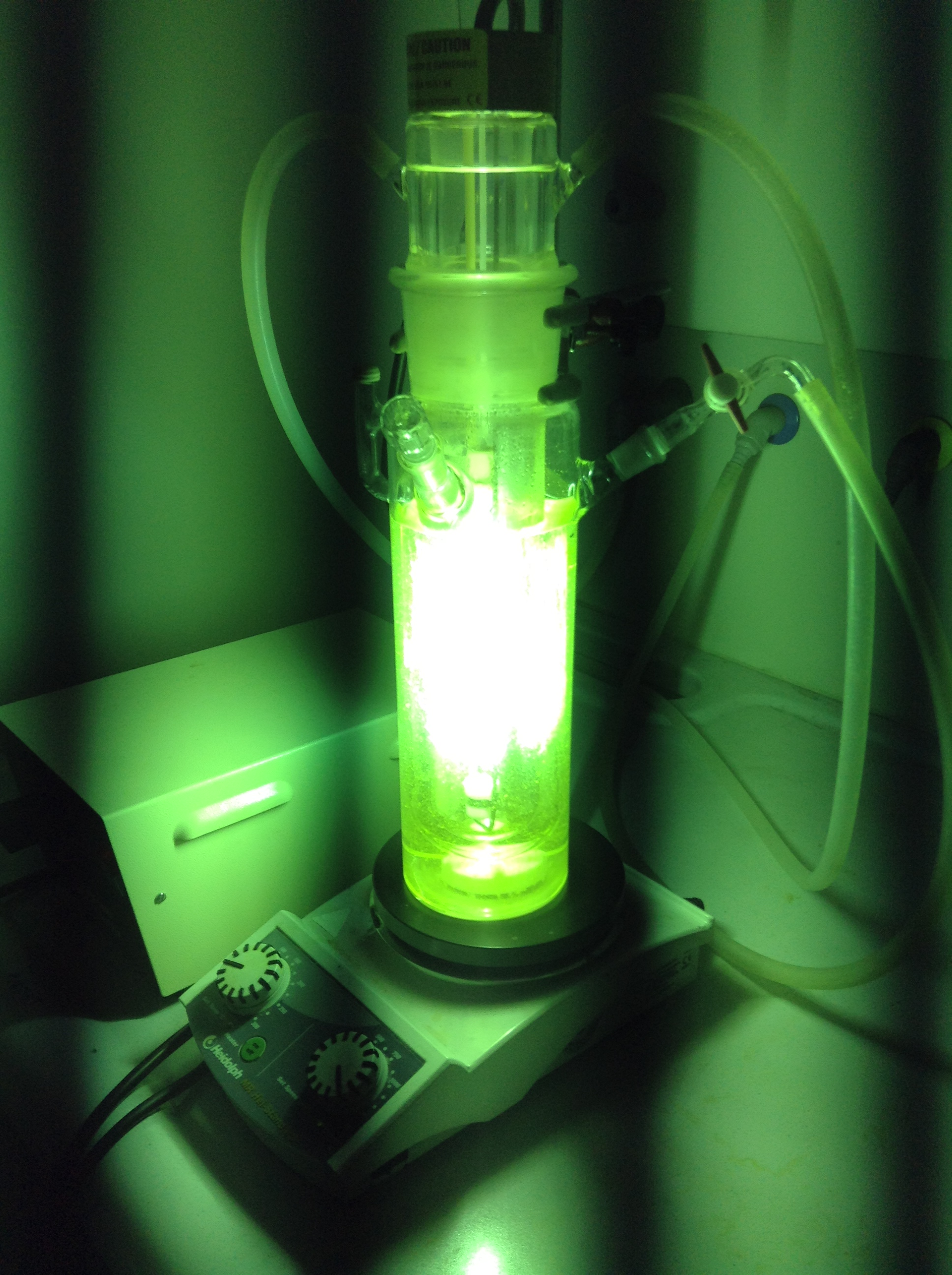
Photochemical immersion well reactor (750 mL) with a mercury-vapor lamp

Photochemical reactions require a light source that emits wavelengths corresponding to an electronic transition in the reactant. In the early experiments (and in everyday life), sunlight was the light source, although it is polychromatic. Mercury-vapor lamps are more common in the laboratory. Low-pressure mercury-vapor lamps mainly emit at 254 nm. For polychromatic sources, wavelength ranges can be selected using filters. Alternatively, laser beams are usually monochromatic (although two or more wavelengths can be obtained using nonlinear optics), and LEDs have a relatively narrow band that can be efficiently used, as well as Rayonet lamps, to get approximately monochromatic beams.

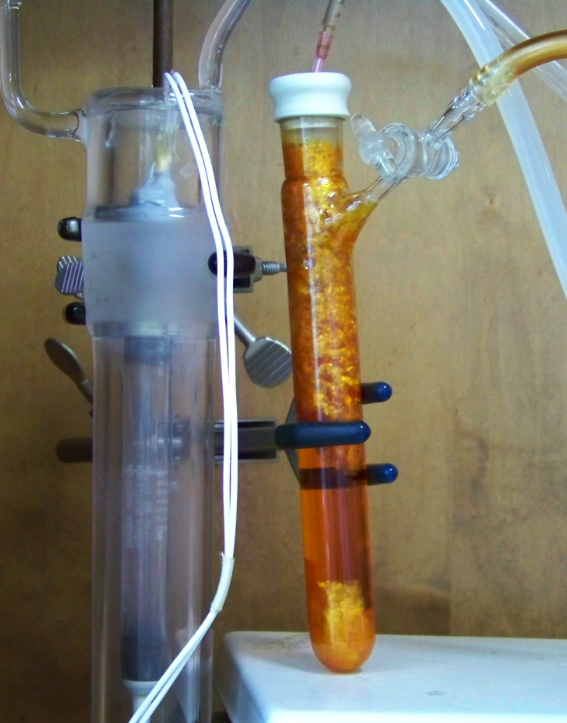
Schlenk tube containing slurry of orange crystals of Fe_{2}(CO)_{9} in acetic acid after its photochemical synthesis from Fe(CO)_{5}. The mercury lamp (connected to white power cords) can be seen on the left, set inside a water-jacketed quartz tube.

The emitted light must reach the targeted functional group without being blocked by the reactor, medium, or other functional groups present. For many applications, quartz is used for the reactors as well as to contain the lamp. Pyrex absorbs at wavelengths shorter than 275 nm. The solvent is an important experimental parameter. Solvents are potential reactants, and for this reason, chlorinated solvents are avoided because the C–Cl bond can lead to chlorination of the substrate. Strongly-absorbing solvents prevent photons from reaching the substrate. Hydrocarbon solvents absorb only at short wavelengths and are thus preferred for photochemical experiments requiring high-energy photons. Solvents containing unsaturation absorb at longer wavelengths and can usefully filter out short wavelengths. For example, cyclohexane and acetone "cut off" (absorb strongly) at wavelengths shorter than 215 and 330 nm, respectively.

Typically, the wavelength employed to induce a photochemical process is selected based on the absorption spectrum of the reactive species, most often the absorption maximum. Over the last years, however, it has been demonstrated that, in the majority of bond-forming reactions, the absorption spectrum does not allow selecting the optimum wavelength to achieve the highest reaction yield based on absorptivity. This fundamental mismatch between absorptivity and reactivity has been elucidated with so-called photochemical action plots.

=== Photochemistry in combination with flow chemistry ===
Continuous-flow photochemistry offers multiple advantages over batch photochemistry. Photochemical reactions are driven by the number of photons that are able to activate molecules causing the desired reaction. The large surface-area-to-volume ratio of a microreactor maximizes the illumination, and at the same time allows for efficient cooling, which decreases the thermal side products.

== Photochemical reactions ==
=== Examples of photochemical reactions ===
- Photosynthesis: Plants use solar energy to convert carbon dioxide and water into glucose and oxygen.
- Human formation of vitamin D by exposure to sunlight
- Bioluminescence: e.g. In fireflies, an enzyme in the abdomen catalyzes a reaction that produces light.
- Polymerizations started by photoinitiators, which decompose upon absorbing light to produce the free radicals for radical polymerization
- Photodegradation of many substances, e.g. polyvinyl chloride and Fp. Medicine bottles are often made from darkened glass to protect the drugs from photodegradation.
- Photochemical rearrangements, e.g. photoisomerization, hydrogen atom transfer, and photochemical electrocyclic reactions
- Photodynamic therapy: Light is used to destroy tumors by the action of singlet oxygen generated by photosensitized reactions of triplet oxygen. Typical photosensitizers include tetraphenylporphyrin and methylene blue. The resulting singlet oxygen is an aggressive oxidant, capable of converting C–H bonds into C–OH groups.
- Diazo printing process
- Photoresist technology, used in the production of microelectronic components
- Vision is initiated by a photochemical reaction of rhodopsin
- Toray photochemical production of ε-caprolactame
- Photochemical production of artemisinin, an anti-malaria drug
- Photoalkylation, used for the light-induced addition of alkyl groups to molecules
- DNA: photodimerization leading to cyclobutane pyrimidine dimers
- Anti-Friedel-Crafts reaction, a technique that uses light instead of toxic chemicals to change complex drug molecules

=== Organic photochemistry ===
Examples of photochemical organic reactions are electrocyclic reactions, radical reactions, photoisomerization, and Norrish reactions.

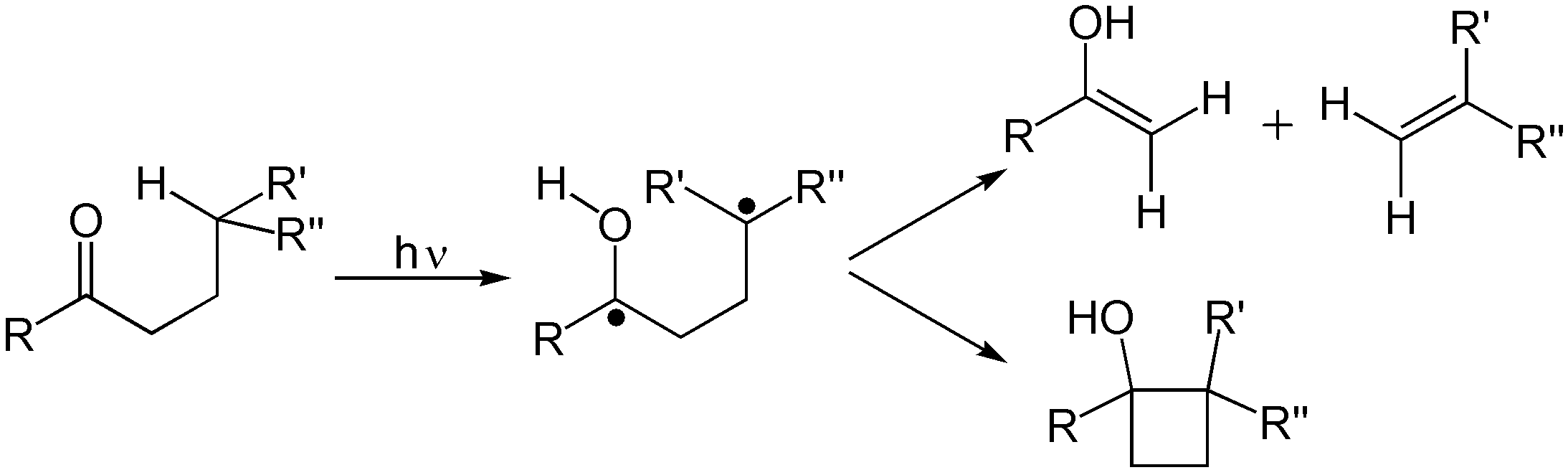
Norrish type II reaction

Alkenes undergo many important reactions that proceed via a photon-induced π to π* transition. The first electronic excited state of an alkene lacks the π-bond, so that rotation about the C–C bond is rapid and the molecule engages in reactions not observed thermally. These reactions include cis-trans isomerization and cycloaddition to other (ground state) alkene to give cyclobutane derivatives. The cis-trans isomerization of a (poly)alkene is involved in retinal, a component of the machinery of vision. The dimerization of alkenes is relevant to the photodamage of DNA, where thymine dimers are observed upon illuminating DNA with UV radiation. Such dimers interfere with transcription. The beneficial effects of sunlight are associated with the photochemically-induced retro-cyclization (decyclization) reaction of ergosterol to give vitamin D. In the DeMayo reaction, an alkene reacts with a 1,3-diketone reacts via its enol to yield a 1,5-diketone. Still another common photochemical reaction is Howard Zimmerman's di-π-methane rearrangement.

In an industrial application, about 100,000 tonnes of benzyl chloride are prepared annually by the gas-phase photochemical reaction of toluene with chlorine. The light is absorbed by chlorine molecules, the low energy of this transition being indicated by the yellowish color of the gas. The photon induces homolysis of the Cl-Cl bond, and the resulting chlorine radical converts toluene to the benzyl radical:

Cl_{2} + hν → 2 Cl·
C_{6}H_{5}CH_{3} + Cl· → C_{6}H_{5}CH_{2}· + HCl
C_{6}H_{5}CH_{2}· + Cl· → C_{6}H_{5}CH_{2}Cl

Mercaptans can be produced by photochemical addition of hydrogen sulfide (H_{2}S) to alpha olefins.

=== Inorganic and organometallic photochemistry ===
Coordination complexes and organometallic compounds are also photoreactive. These reactions can entail cis-trans isomerization. More commonly, photoreactions result in dissociation of ligands, since the photon excites an electron on the metal to an orbital that is antibonding with respect to the ligands. Thus, metal carbonyls that resist thermal substitution undergo decarbonylation upon irradiation with UV light. UV-irradiation of a THF solution of molybdenum hexacarbonyl gives the THF complex, which is synthetically useful:

Mo(CO)_{6} + THF → Mo(CO)_{5}(THF) + CO

In a related reaction, photolysis of iron pentacarbonyl affords diiron nonacarbonyl (see figure):

2 Fe(CO)_{5} → Fe_{2}(CO)_{9} + CO

Select photoreactive coordination complexes can undergo oxidation-reduction processes via single electron transfer. This electron transfer can occur within the inner or outer coordination sphere of the metal.

=== Types of photochemical reactions ===
Here are some different types of photochemical reactions-

- Photo-dissociation: AB + hν → A* + B*
- Photo induced rearrangements, isomerization: A + hν → B
- Photo-addition: A + B + hν → AB + C
- Photo-substitution: A + BC + hν → AB + C
- Photoredox catalysis : A + B + hν → A− + B+

=== Efficiency of photochemical reactions ===
The efficiency of a photochemical reaction can be expressed by the quantum yield (Φ). This quantity represents the number of molecules undergoing a given reaction for every single photon that is absorbed and is given by the following equation:

$\Phi=\frac{\rm \#\ molecules\ undergoing\ reaction\ of\ interest}{\rm \#\ photons\ absorbed\ by\ photoreactive\ substance}$

=== Historical ===
Although bleaching has long been practiced, the first photochemical reaction was described by Trommsdorff in 1834. He observed that crystals of the compound α-santonin when exposed to sunlight turned yellow and burst. In a 2007 study the reaction was described as a succession of three steps taking place within a single crystal.

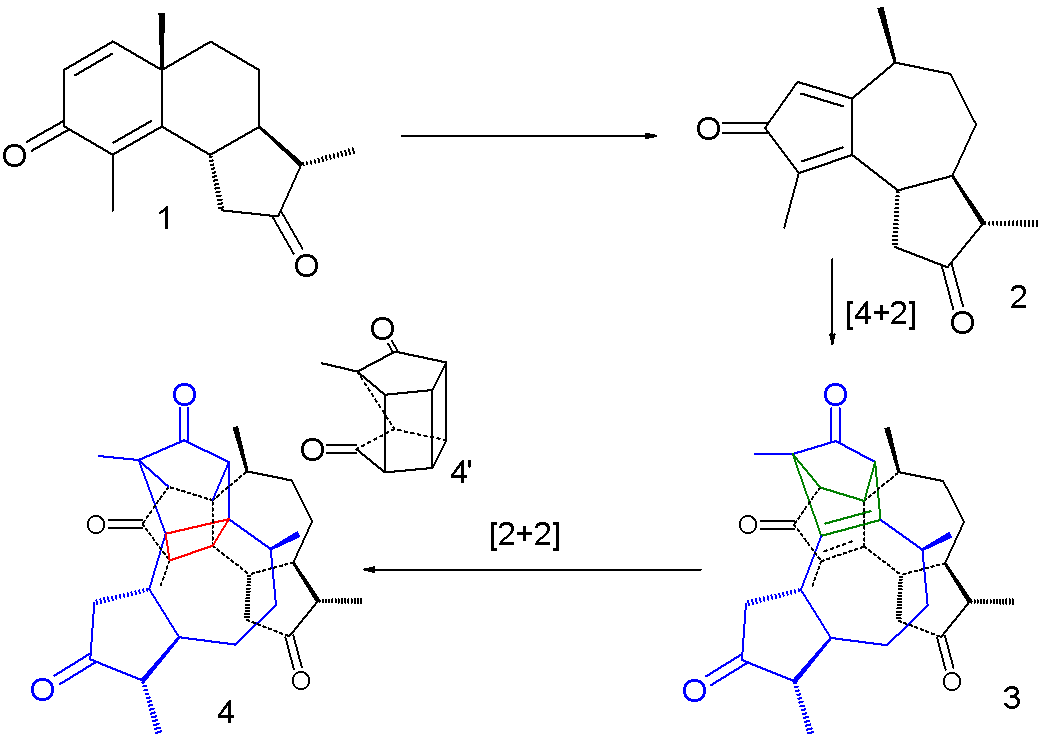

The first step is a rearrangement reaction to a cyclopentadienone intermediate (2), the second one a dimerization in a Diels–Alder reaction (3), and the third one an intramolecular [2+2]cycloaddition (4). The bursting effect is attributed to a large change in crystal volume on dimerization.

== See also ==
- Photonic molecule
- Photoelectrochemical cell
- Photochemical logic gate
- Photosynthesis
- Light-dependent reactions
- List of photochemists
- Single-photon source
- Photogeochemistry
- Photoelectric effect
- Photolysis
- Blueprint
