= Östergötland Runic Inscription 179 =

Coordinates: 58°27′02″N 14°53′33″E

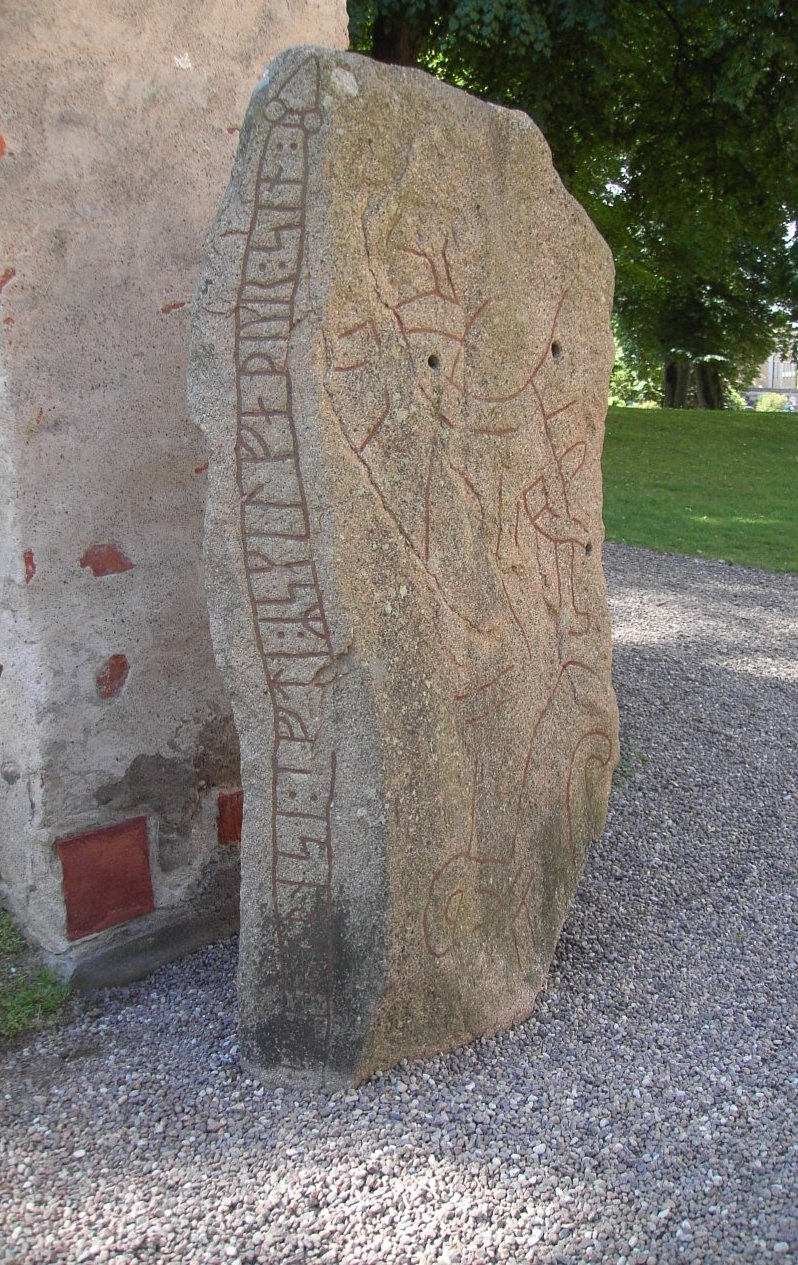
- Created: unknown
- Discovered: Vadstena, Östergötland, Sweden
- Runemaster: unknown

The runestone known as Östergötland Rune Inscription 179 or Ög 179, as listed in the Rundata catalog, stands on the east side of the Vadstena Abbey in Vadstena, Sweden. The stone is tinted red and is about 193 cm in height. The inscription is classified as being carved in runestone style Fp. This is the classification for runic bands that have attached serpent or beast heads depicted as seen from above.

The earliest information about this stone indicates that it originally stood close to Lake Vättern. When it was moved to its present location it was discovered that the lower part of the stone had been worn away by the waves and none of the runes on that part of the stone remain.

The runic text indicates that the stone was raised as a memorial to a father named Áskell. In the text, the runes for the initial vowels in Old Norse words for æftiʀ ("after") and the name Æskel were replaced by a ʀ-rune. A similar replacement of the initial vowel in the word æftiʀ is indicated on eight other inscriptions, Ög 219 in Lundby, Sö 82 in Tumbo, Sö 98 in Jäders, U 742 in Myrby, U 771 in Tjursåker, U 789 in Mälby, U 791 in Tibble, and U 1152 in Brunnby.

== Inscription ==
… …i : stin : þonsi : ʀfti : ʀskil faþur sin :
… … {} stein {} þenna {} eptir {} Áskel, fǫður sinn. {}
… … {} stæin {} þannsi {} æftiʀ {} Æskel, faður sinn. {}
… this stone in memory of Áskell, his father.
