= Grotthuss mechanism =

Protons hopping across hydrogen bonds between hydronium ions and water molecules

Protons tunnel across a series of hydrogen bonds between hydronium ions and water molecules.

The Grotthuss mechanism (also known as proton jumping) is a model for the process by which an 'excess' proton diffuses through the hydrogen bond network of water molecules or other hydrogen-bonded liquids through the formation and concomitant cleavage of covalent bonds involving neighboring molecules.

In his 1806 publication “Theory of decomposition of liquids by electrical currents”, Theodor Grotthuss proposed a theory of water conductivity. Grotthuss envisioned the electrolytic reaction as a sort of ‘bucket line’ where each oxygen atom simultaneously passes and receives a single hydrogen ion. It was an astonishing theory to propose at the time, since the water molecule was thought to be OH, not H_{2}O, and the existence of ions was not fully understood. On its 200th anniversary, his article was reviewed by Cukierman.

Although Grotthuss was using an incorrect empirical formula of water, his description of the passing of protons through the cooperation of neighboring water molecules proved prescient.

Lemont Kier suggested that proton hopping may be an important mechanism for nerve transduction.

== Proton transport mechanism and proton-hopping mechanism ==
The Grotthuss mechanism is now a general name for the proton-hopping mechanism. In liquid water the solvation of the excess proton is idealized by two forms: the H_{9}O_{4}^{+} (Eigen cation) or H_{5}O_{2}^{+} (Zundel cation). While the transport mechanism is believed to involve the inter-conversion between these two solvation structures, the details of the hopping and transport mechanism is still debated. Currently there are two plausible mechanisms:

1. Eigen to Zundel to Eigen (E–Z–E), on the basis of experimental NMR data,
2. Zundel to Zundel (Z–Z), on the basis of molecular dynamics simulation.

The calculated energetics of the hydronium solvation shells were reported in 2007 and it was suggested that the activation energies of the two proposed mechanisms do not agree with their calculated hydrogen bond strengths, but mechanism 1 might be the better candidate of the two.

By use of conditional and time-dependent radial distribution functions (RDF), it was shown that the hydronium RDF can be decomposed into contributions from two distinct structures, Eigen and Zundel. The first peak in g(r) (the RDF) of the Eigen structure is similar to the equilibrium, standard RDF, only slightly more ordered, while the first peak of the Zundel structure is actually split into two peaks. The actual proton transfer (PT) event was then traced (after synchronizing all PT events so that t=0 is the actual event time), revealing that the hydronium indeed starts from an Eigen state, and quickly transforms into the Zundel state as the proton is being transferred, with the first peak of g(r) splitting into two.

For a number of important gas phase reactions, like the hydration of carbon dioxide, a Grotthuss-like mechanism involving concerted proton hopping over several water molecules at the same time has been shown to describe the reaction kinetics. This Grotthuss-like concerted proton transfer seems to be especially important for atmospheric chemistry reactions, like the hydration of sulfur oxides, the hydrolysis of chlorine nitrate and other reactions important for ozone depletion.

== The anomalous diffusion of protons ==
The Grotthuss mechanism, along with the relative lightness and small size (ionic radius) of the proton, explains the unusually high diffusion rate of the proton in an electric field, relative to that of other common cations whose movement is due simply to acceleration by the field. Random thermal motion opposes the movement of both protons and other cations. Quantum tunnelling becomes more probable the smaller the mass of the cation is, and the proton is the lightest possible stable cation. Thus there is a minor effect from quantum tunnelling also, although it dominates at low temperatures only.

Electromobility of cations in an electrical field
Cation (—)	Electrical mobility (cm^{2} s^{−1} V^{−1})
Na^{+}	0.519 × 10^{−3}
K^{+}	0.762 × 10^{−3}
NH_{4}^{+}	0.763 × 10^{−3}
H^{+}	3.62 × 10^{−3}

== Possible alternative mechanism ==
Some evidence from theoretical calculations, supported by recent X-ray absorption spectroscopy findings, has suggested an alternative mechanism in which the proton is attached to a "train" of three water molecules as it moves through the liquid.
