= List of runologists =

This is a list of notable runologists. Runologists are people who study runes and runic inscriptions.

== Runologists ==
- Elmer H. Antonsen (1929–2008), US
- Erik Brate (1857–1924), Sweden
- Jackson Crawford (born 1985), US
- Klaus Düwel (1935–2020), Germany
- Ralph Elliott (1921–2012), Australia
- Ottar Grønvik (1916–2008), Norway
- Daniel Henry Haigh (1819–1879), UK
- Lis Jacobsen (1882–1981), Denmark
- Sven B.F. Jansson (1906–1987), Sweden
- Wolfgang Krause (1895–1970), Germany
- Erik Moltke (1901–1984), Denmark
- R. I. Page (1924–2012), UK
- George Stephens (1813–1895), UK
- Ludvig Wimmer (1839–1920), Denmark

== See also ==
- List of runestones
- Lists of people by occupation
