= List of photochemists =

This is a list of notable photochemists. Photochemistry, a sub-discipline of chemistry, is the study of chemical reactions that proceed with the absorption of light by atoms or molecules.

== Photochemists ==
- Nicola Armaroli
- Vincenzo Balzani
- E. J. Bowen
- John William Draper
- Arthur Eichengrün
- Theodor Grotthuss
- Selig Hecht
- Michael Kasha
- Walter Metcalf
- David Phillips
- James Pitts
- Fritz Weigert
- Zhenghua ZHU (List of publications, incomplete)

== See also ==
- Photochemistry
- Lists of people by occupation
