= Runology =

Study of Runic alphabets

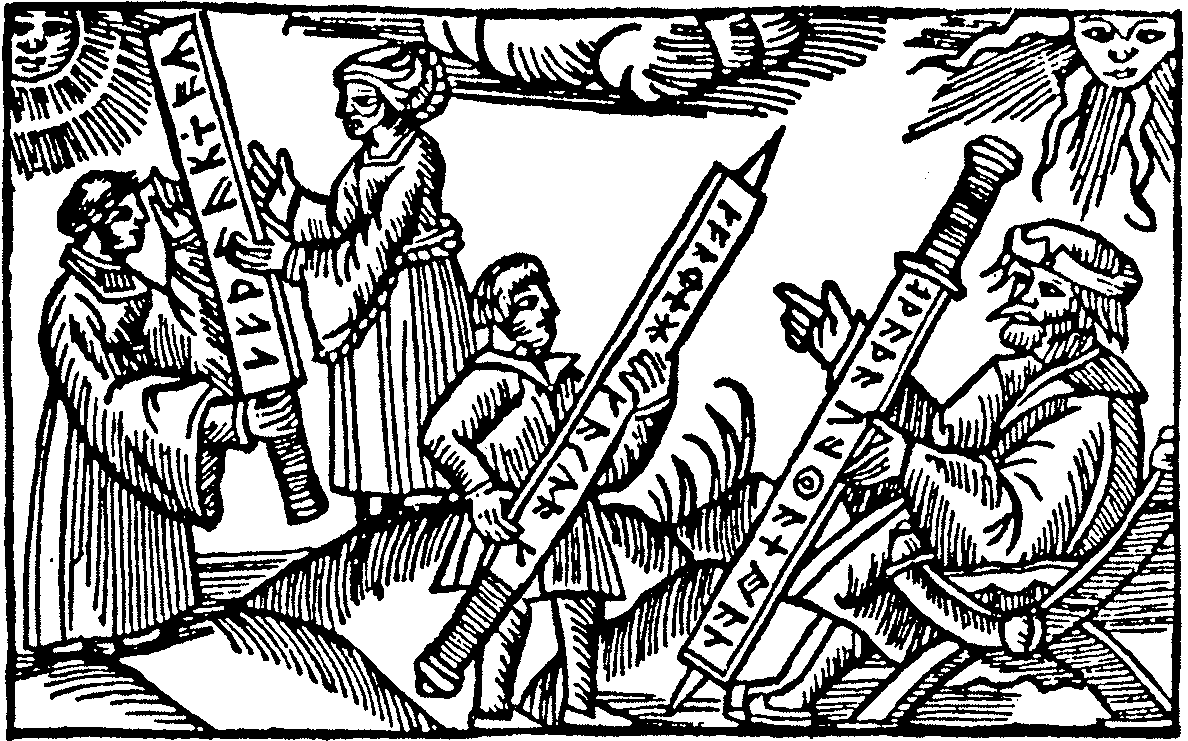
Children being taught a runic alphabet (1555), from Olaus Magnus's Historia de gentibus septentrionalibus

Runology is the study of the runic alphabets, runic inscriptions, and their history. Runology forms a specialized branch of Germanic linguistics.

== History ==
Runology was initiated by Johannes Bureus (1568–1652), who was interested in the linguistics of the Geatish language (Götiska språket), i.e. Old Norse. However, he did not look at the runes as merely an alphabet, but rather something holy or magical.

The study of runes was continued by Olof Rudbeck the Elder (1630–1702) and presented in his collection Atlantica. The physicist Anders Celsius (1701–1744) further extended the science of runes and traveled around Sweden to examine the bautastenar (megaliths, today termed runestones). Another early treatise is the 1732 Runologia by Jón Ólafsson of Grunnavík.

The sundry runic scripts were well understood by the 19th century, when their analysis became an integral part of the Germanic philology and historical linguistics. Wilhelm Grimm published his Über deutsche Runen in 1821, where among other things he dwelt upon the "Marcomannic runes" (chapter 18, pp. 149–159). In 1828, he published a supplement, titled Zur Literatur der Runen, where he discusses the Abecedarium Nordmannicum.

Sveriges runinskrifter was published from 1900. The dedicated journal Nytt om runer has been published by the "Runic Archives" of the Museum of Cultural History at the University of Oslo from 1985. The Rundata project, aiming at a machine-readable catalogue of runic inscriptions, was initiated in 1993.

== See also ==
- Bautil
- List of runestones
- List of runologists
- Runic transliteration and transcription
- Sveriges runinskrifter
