= Jötunvillur =

Jötunvillur are a set of runic code inscriptions dating back to the Viking Age. Although previously untranslatable, a proposed solution to the code was announced by the runologist K Jonas Nordby in 2014. Each rune is written as the rune representing the last letter of its name.

== See also ==
- List of runestones
