= List of media proprietors =

The following is a list of media proprietors.

== A ==
- Israel Asper - CanWest, Canada

== B ==
- Jeff Bezos - Washington Post
- Conrad Black
- Martin Bouygues - TF1, Bouygues
- Silvio Berlusconi - Canale 5, Italia 1, Rete 4, Telecinco, Il Giornale, Panorama (Italian magazine)

== C ==
- Gustavo Cisneros - Venevisión

== D ==
- Richard Desmond - Northern & Shell, UK
- Felix Dennis, UK
- Barry Diller - USA Interactive, US

== E ==
- Michael Eisner - Walt Disney Company, US
- Charlie Ergen - Dish Network, US

== F ==
- Larry Flynt - Hustler, UK

== G ==
- David Geffen - DreamWorks Animation SKG
- Al Gore - current.tv

== J ==
- Steve Jobs - Pixar, US

== K ==
- Jeffrey Katzenberg - DreamWorks Animation SKG, US
- Leo Kirch - KirchMedia, Germany

== M ==
- José Roberto Marinho - Globo, Brazil
- Roberto Irineu Marinho - Globo, Brazil
- João Roberto Marinho - Globo, Brazil
- Robert Maxwell - Maxwell Communications Corporation, UK
- Jean-Marie Messier - Vivendi Universal, France
- Javier Moll, Spain, Australia
- James Murdoch - British Sky Broadcasting, UK
- Rupert Murdoch - News Corporation, US, UK, Australia

== O ==
- Tony O'Reilly - Independent News & Media, Ireland

== R ==
- Sumner Redstone - Viacom, CBS Corporation, US

== S ==
- Patrick Soon-Shiong - Los Angeles Times & San Diego Tribunal
- Steven Spielberg - DreamWorks Animation SKG

== T ==
- Lisa Tolliver, US
- Ted Turner, US

== W ==
- Bob Weinstein - The Weinstein Company, US
- Harvey Weinstein - The Weinstein Company, US
- Oprah Winfrey - Harpo Productions
