= Bautil =

Swedish runology work of 1750

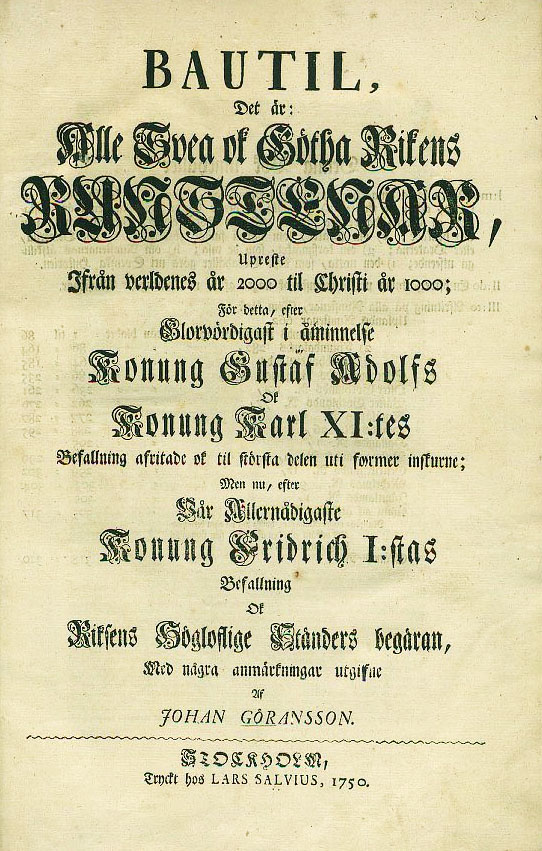
The cover page of Bautil (1750).

Bautil is a fundamental Swedish runological work by the priest, runologist and archaeologist Johan Göransson, published in 1750.

The full title of the work is: Bautil, det är: alle Svea ok Götha rikens runstenar, upreste ifrån verldenes år 2000 til Christi år 1000; för detta, efter glorvördigast i åminnelse konung Gustaf Adolfs ok konung Karl XI:tes befallning afritade ok til största delen : uti former inskurne; men nu, efter vår allernådigaste konung Fridrich I:stas befallning ok riksens högloflige ständers begäran, med några anmärkningar utgifne af Johan Göransson.

Bautil is strongly influenced by the ideas of Olaus Rudbeck (also known as Olof Rudbeck the Elder). When he made the compilation, Göransson used drawings and transcripts made by Johan Hadorph, Johan Peringskiöld, Nils Wessman, Petrus Törnevall and others. It is the first collection of depictions of Swedish runestones that was intended to be complete, and the work has been of great importance for the modern knowledge of runestones and runic inscriptions. The greatest significance of Bautil is that many now lost runestones are depicted there. It contains 1,173 woodcuts.

== Digital version ==
- Bautil digitized.

== See also ==
- List of runestones
