= List of social theorists =

A list of social theorists includes classical as well as modern thinkers in social theory that were notable for the impact of their published works on the general discipline of sociology. Several of these names are taken from the Encyclopedia of Social Theory.

- Jane Addams
- Theodor Adorno
- Muhammad Asad
- Roland Barthes
- Simone de Beauvoir
- Peter L. Berger
- William Edward Burghardt Du Bois
- Louis de Bonald
- Pierre Bourdieu, 1930-2002
- Auguste Comte
- Charles Cooley
- Anna Julia Cooper
- Émile Durkheim
- Norbert Elias
- Friedrich Engels
- Amitai Etzioni
- Adam Ferguson
- Michel Foucault, 1926-1984
- Paulo Freire
- Ernest Gellner
- Charlotte Perkins Gilman
- Max Gluckman
- Erving Goffman, 1922-1982
- Antonio Gramsci
- Ludwig Gumplowicz
- Jürgen Habermas
- Friedrich Hayek
- Peter Kropotkin
- Henri Lefebvre
- Vladimir Lenin
- Niklas Luhmann, 1927-1998
- György Lukács
- Rosa Luxemburg
- Jean-François Lyotard
- Joseph de Maistre
- Karl Mannheim
- Harriet Martineau
- Karl Marx
- George Herbert Mead
- Ludwig von Mises
- Robert King Merton
- John Stuart Mill
- Charles Wright Mills
- Montesquieu
- Vilfredo Pareto
- Robert Ezra Park
- Talcott Parsons
- Michael Polanyi
- Claude Henri de Rouvroy, Comte de Saint-Simon
- Georg Simmel
- Dorothy E. Smith
- Pitirim A. Sorokin
- Herbert Spencer
- Rudolf Steiner
- William Graham Sumner
- Gabriel Tarde
- William Isaac Thomas
- Alexis de Tocqueville
- Ferdinand Tönnies
- Thorstein Veblen
- Immanuel Wallerstein
- Beatrice Webb
- Marianne Weber
- Max Weber
