= Rus' raids on the Caspian Sea =

Medieval naval military expeditions

- Part of Caspian expeditions of the Rus'
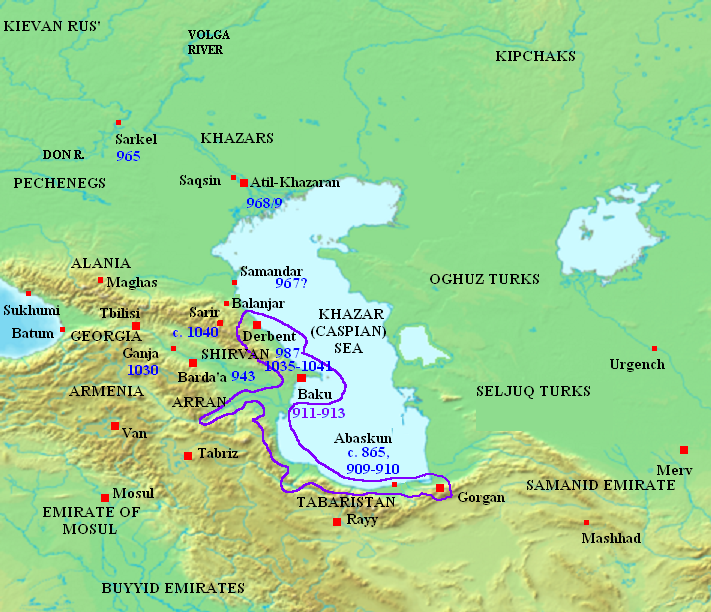
- Map of Kievan Rus' raids in the Caspian Sea
Date	864-914
Location	Caspian Sea (Most raids); Gilan, Daylam, Tabaristan, Abaskun (Other raids) 42.0°N 50.5°E
Result	Muslim victory
Territorial changes	The Kievan Rus' withdrew and the raids all stopped

Belligerents
Kievan Rus	Samanid Empire; Alavids; Kingdom of Shirvan; Khazar Khaganate

Commanders and leaders
Oleg the Wise	Ahmad Samani; Hasan ibn Zayd; Hasan al-Utrush; Ibn al-Haytham Shirvani; Aaron II

Strength
35,000-50,000	15,000

Casualties and losses
30,000 killed 5,000 escaped	Unknown

The Rus' raids on the Caspian Sea Between 864 and 914, the Rus' launched several raids across the Caspian Sea. These were expansionist campaigns intended to bring the Caspian region and its surrounding territories under Rus' control.

As these campaigns began, they were met with resistance from local Islamic states, most notably the Alavids of Tabaristan and the Shirvanshahs. This period was marked by frequent raids and military conflicts between the Rus' and these regional powers.

== Background ==
Initially, the Rus' operated as merchants, trading furs in Muslim markets along the Don and Volga rivers to reach the Caspian Sea. At that time, the Khazars controlled the region and imposed taxes on the Rus' for entry and exit.

After years of paying these heavy duties, the Rus' shifted their strategy toward piracy. This escalation eventually turned into a series of military campaigns aimed at seizing control of the Caspian Sea and its surrounding territories from Muslim rule, as well as establishing a monopoly on the trade near the Volga.

== First raids (864-884) ==
The Rus' launched a series of violent raids against Abaskun, a key port and region bordering the Caspian Sea. Historical records regarding these specific attacks are sparse, and the identity of the Rus' commander remains unknown.

However, some accounts state that Hasan ibn Zayd (known as al-Da'i al-Kabir), and the Alavid ruler of Tabaristan, successfully repelled the invaders. It is reported that he managed the defense and emerged victorious in every encounter. After suffering these heavy losses, the Rus' were forced to halt their advance into the region.

== Second raids (909) ==
Following their initial defeat, the Rus' focused on strengthening their military and expanding their fleet to launch more powerful raids on the Caspian Sea. By 909 they had significantly increased their naval capabilities. During this year, a fleet of sixteen ships attacked and looted the port of Abaskun.

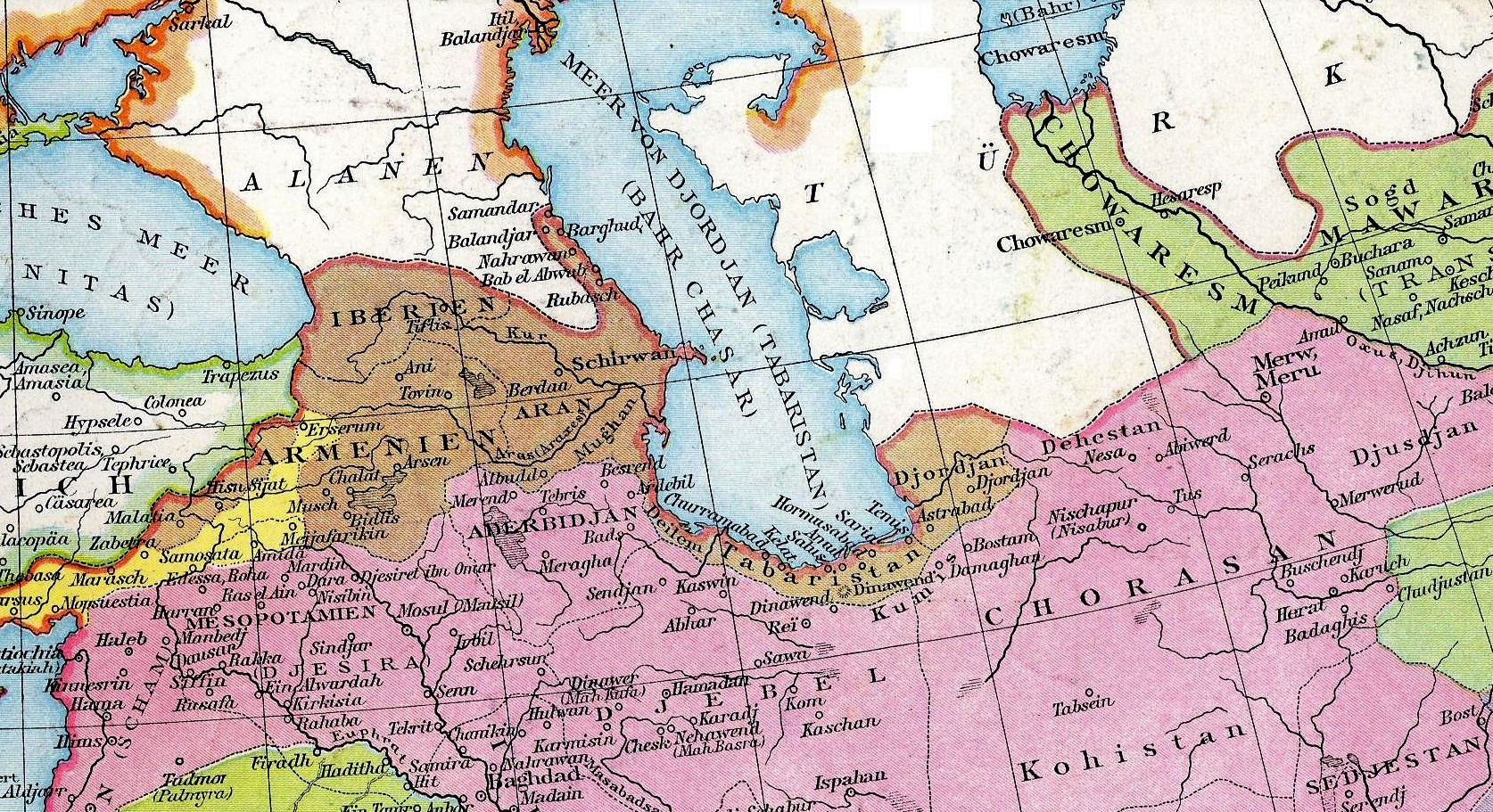
Map of the Caspian Sea in the Middle East

In response to the escalation, the ruler of Sari appealed to the Samanids and the Alavids of Tabaristan for military assistance. The regional forces successfully coordinated a counter-offensive, defeating the Rus' during a night attack in the Gilan region.

== Third raids (910-911) ==
Following their previous setbacks, the Rus' launched a third large-scale invasion, deploying a much larger force than in earlier campaigns. They targeted Sari (the site of their previous defeat) burning the city and taking many of its inhabitants captive.

The Rus' then advanced toward the Daylam region. However, they were met with a surprise counter-attack by the Alavids of Tabaristan. Hasan ibn Ali (also known as Al-Utrush) had mobilized a large army in anticipation of the invasion or in response to the destruction of Sari.

The conflict reached a turning point when the local population of Gilan set fire to the Rus' fleet under the cover of night, killing the soldiers stationed on the shores. The remaining Rus' forces attempted to retreat but were intercepted by Ibn al-Haytham, the ruler of Shirvan, who orchestrated a final ambush that eliminated the survivors.

In the year 911, Abdullah ibn Nuh, with his organized forces, led a surprise attack on the Russians; many Russians were killed. However, in the same year, Abdullah died. The Russians then intensified their attacks against the local populations of the southern provinces of the Caspian Sea.

== The Great campaign (912-914) ==
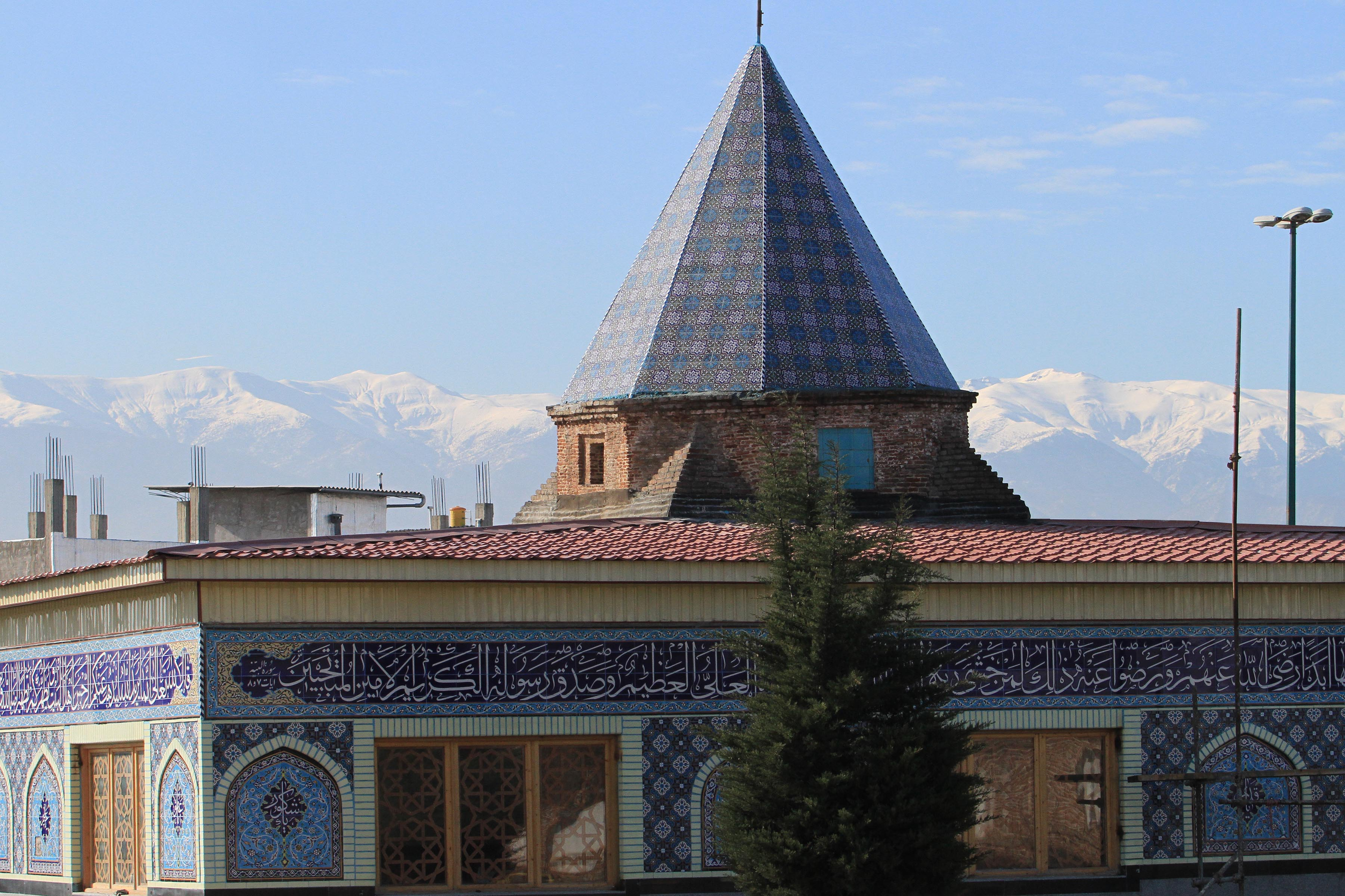
The shrine of Hasan al-Utrush, the Alavid leader of Tabaristan who participated in this Raids.

Following earlier raids, the Rus' launched their largest and most aggressive military campaign in the region. Moving beyond simple raids, this was a full-scale invasion. The Rus' first targeted and captured Baku, then a part of the Shirvanshah, along with several nearby islands.

According to Al-Mas'udi, the sea of Azov belongs to the Rus', and no one else sails on its waters but them. According to him, the Rus' had a good relationship with the Khazar rulers, who in 912 permitted them to use the lower Volga to enter the Caspian Sea in order to raid the population living on its coastline in return for half the spoils. In another account, he claims that they resided by the Caucasus. The close relationship between the Rus' and the Turkics is further explained in Ibn Fadlan’s account.

After reaching an agreement with the Khazars for safe passage, a massive Rus' fleet of 500 ships entered the Caspian Sea, which split into two groups and launched a brutal assault on the southern and western coastlines, specifically targeting Gilan, Daylam, Tabaristan, and Abaskun. Historical accounts describe this phase as particularly violent, involving widespread looting, the burning of villages, and the displacement of local populations.

While the Rus' initially overwhelmed local defenses, a unified force of 15,000 Muslim soldiers arrived to confront the invaders. A fierce battle ensued, lasting for three days. Despite the initial strength and reputation of the Rus' fighters, they ultimately suffered a catastrophic defeat and were forced to retreat.

The aftermath of the battle was devastating for the Rus' forces. It is estimated that nearly 30,000 Rus' soldiers were killed in combat or drowned while attempting to flee, while only about 5,000 managed to escape and sail back. This decisive victory for the regional Muslim forces effectively brought an end to the era of major Rus' expeditions on the Caspian Sea.

== Aftermath ==
Constant raids increased tensions between the Rus' and the Khazars, as the Rus' needed to cross the Khazar lands to reach the Caspian Sea. In 960s, Svyatoslav I a leader of Scandinavian origin, destroyed the Khazar capital Attila. This victory gave Rus' full control over the trade route of the Volga.

Raids in the region continued in the 11th century. To protect the growing state, Yaroslav the wise fortified the city of Kiev with huge defensive walls and large gates. The most famous of them, the Golden Gate, still stands today (rebuilt) and has an Orthodox Church on top.

== See also ==
- Caspian expeditions of the Rus'
- Chechen–Russian conflict
- Caspian Sea
