= Caspian expeditions of the Rus' =

Military raids from 9th to 11th centuries

Caspian expeditions of the Rus
- Part of campaigns of the Varangians and Rus
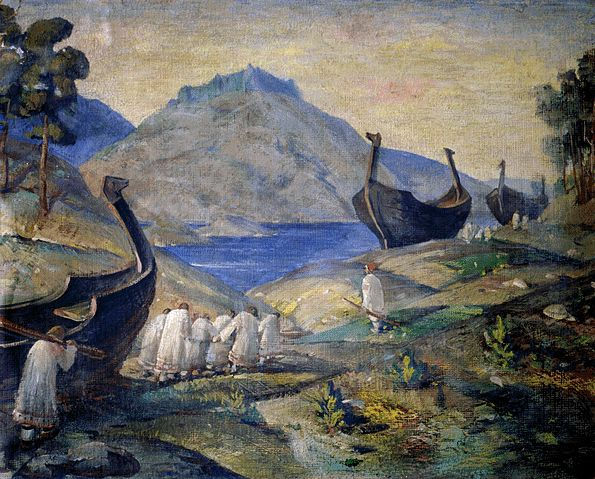
- 1915 interpretation of Rus' Varangians and their longships in Gardariki, by Nicholas Roerich
Date	The end of 9th century – 1041
Location	Coast of the Caspian Sea
Result	Rus' victory
Territorial changes	Gradual weakening of Khazaria, establishment of Kievan Rus' control over key trade routes

Belligerents
The Rus'; Gorgan; Alans	Khazars; Local Muslims; Volga Bulgaria

Commanders and leaders
Sviatoslav I Igor Rurikovich; Ingvar the Traveler	Unknown

Strength
up to 500 ships	Unknown, but it included large armies of Muslim states and Khazar cavalry

Casualties and losses
Thousands killed (including due to diseases, attacks by the Khazars and local tribes)	Significant losses among residents of cities and military garrisons

The Caspian expeditions of the Rus' were military raids undertaken by the Rus' between the late 9th century (Note: 'Sometime during the reign of Hasan Ibn Zaid, ruler of Tabaristan (r. 864–884), the Rus sailed into the Caspian Sea and unsuccessfully attacked the eastern shore at Abaskun. This was probably a raid on very small scale (...) Great raids, however, took place in c. 913, in 943, in 965 and in c. 1041.') and c. 1041 on the Caspian Sea shores, of what are nowadays Iran, Dagestan, and Azerbaijan. Initially, the Rus' appeared in Serkland in the 9th century travelling as merchants along the Volga trade route, selling furs, honey, and slaves. The first small-scale Viking raids took place in the late 9th and early 10th century. The Rus' undertook the first large-scale expedition in 913; having arrived on 500 ships, they pillaged in the Gorgan region, in the territory of present-day Iran, and more to the west, in Gilan and Mazandaran, taking slaves and goods. On their return, the northern raiders were attacked and defeated by the Khazars in the Volga Delta, and those who escaped were killed by the local tribes in the middle Volga.

During their next expedition in 943, the Rus' captured Bardha'a, the capital of Arran, in the modern-day Republic of Azerbaijan. The Rus' stayed there for several months, killing many inhabitants of the city and amassing substantial plunder. It was only an outbreak of dysentery among the Rus' that forced them to depart with their spoils. Sviatoslav, prince of Kiev, commanded the next attack, which destroyed the Khazar state in 965. Sviatoslav's campaign established the Rus's hold on the north-south trade routes, helping to alter the demographics of the region. Raids continued through the time period with the last Scandinavian attempt to reestablish the route to the Caspian Sea taking place in c. 1041 by Ingvar the Far-Travelled.

== Background and early raids ==
The Rus' first penetrated to the Muslim areas adjacent to the Caspian Sea as traders rather than warriors. By the early 9th century, the Norsemen settled in northwestern Russia, where they established a settlement called Aldeigja (Slavic: Ladoga) about 6 miles (9.7 km) south of the Volkhov River entry into Lake Ladoga. From there, they began trading with the Byzantine Empire along the Dnieper trade route and with the Muslim lands around the Caspian Sea along the Volga trade route. In the late 9th century, ibn Khordadbeh described the Rus' buying goods from the Khazars in the market areas on the lower Volga and selling them on the markets of Caspian towns; these merchants brought furs, honey, and slaves. Small groups of the Rus' even went on camels as far as Baghdad to sell their goods; their European slaves interpreted for them.

Thomas S. Noonan suggested that the Rus' reached Baghdad as early as 800; this argument is supported by the finding of Sassanid, Arab, and Arabo-Sassanid dirham coins dated no later than 804–805 at Peterhof, near Saint-Petersburg. In ibn Khordadbeh's account, the Rus' are described as "a kind of the Saqaliba", a term usually used to refer to Slavs, and anti-Normanist scholars have interpreted this passage as indicative of the Rus' being Slavs rather than Scandinavians. In the interpretation of the Normanist scholars, the word Saqaliba was also frequently applied to all fair-haired, ruddy-complexioned populations of Central, Eastern, and Northeastern Europe, so ibn Khordadbeh's language is ambiguous here.

The first Caspian raid of the Rus' occurred sometime in the reign of Hasan ibn Zaid, ruler of Tabaristan between 864 and 884. The Rus' sailed into the Caspian Sea and unsuccessfully attacked its eastern shore at Abaskun. This raid was probably on a very small scale. The second raid took place in 909 or 910 (Note: Information about the Rus' raids comes largely from Muslim sources, which use the Islamic calendar. Because the years of the Islamic calendar do not map exactly to the years of the Gregorian calendar, an event dated to a certain year of the Islamic calendar may have occurred in either of the two consecutive years of the Gregorian calendar.) and was likewise aimed at Abaskun; just like the previous attack, this expedition was a minor one with only sixteen ships participating in it. The third minor raid took place in 911 or 912.

== Raid of 913 ==
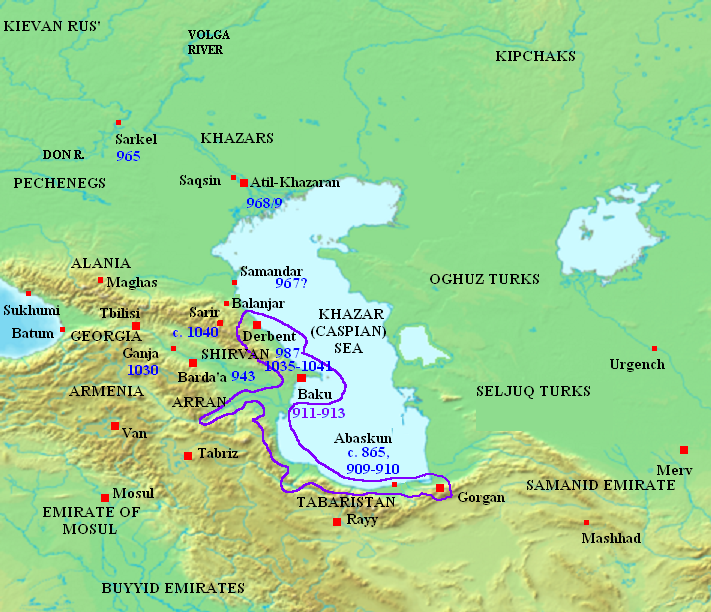
Map showing the locations of major Rus' raids around the Caspian Sea, mid-9th to mid-11th century. Blue dates indicate major Rus' raids; purple outline indicates area affected by the 913 Caspian invasion. Names of polities shown depict the situation c. 950.

The Rus' launched the first large-scale raid in 913. A fleet of 500 ships reached the southern shores of the Caspian Sea through the country of the Khazars. In order to secure a peaceful passage through the land of the Khazars, the Rus' promised the Khazars half of their spoils. They sailed down the Dnieper River into the Black Sea, then into the Sea of Azov, then up the Don River past the Khazar city of Sarkel, and then by a portage reached the Volga, which led them into the Caspian Sea.

The Rus' attacked in the Gorgan region around Abaskun, as well as Tabaristan, pillaging the countryside as they went. An attempt to repel them as they lay in anchor near islands in the southwestern part of the Caspian Sea proved unsuccessful, and they were then able to roam and raid at will. Across the sea they raided at Baku, penetrating inland a distance of three days' journey, and plundering the regions of Arran, Tabaristan, Beylagan, and Shirvan. Everywhere they looted as much as they could, taking women and children as slaves. The news of their outrages preceded them as they headed homeward and, in the Volga Delta, the Rus' were attacked by Muslims, as well as by some Christians, apparently with the acquiescence of the Khazar ruler. According to al-Masudi, those who escaped were finished off by the Burtas and Volga Bulgars.

== Raid of 943 ==
The second large-scale campaign is dated to 943, when Igor was the prince of Kievan Rus', according to the Primary Chronicle. (Note: The Primary Chronicle itself does not mention a Caspian expedition of any kind sub anno 6452 (943 or 944); instead, Igor is said to have led his druzhina and Pecheneg mercenaries "in ships and on horses against the Greeks". Igor held a war council next to the Danube, where he heard the Byzantine emperor Romanus offer an increased tribute to fend off the invasion. Igor accepted, and had the Pechenegs plunder Bulgaria instead, while returning home to Kiev with lots of gold and other precious goods.) During the 943 expedition, the Rus' rowed up the Kura River, deep into the Caucasus, defeated the forces of Marzuban bin Muhammad, and captured Bardha'a, the capital of Arran. The Rus' allowed the local people to retain their religion in exchange for recognition of their overlordship; it is possible that the Rus' intended to settle permanently there. According to ibn Miskawaih, the local people broke the peace by stone-throwing and other abuse directed against the Rus', who then demanded that the inhabitants evacuate the city. This ultimatum was rejected, and the Rus' began killing people and holding many for ransom. The slaughter was briefly interrupted for negotiations, which soon broke down. The Rus' stayed in Bardha'a for several months, using it as a base for plundering the adjacent areas, and amassing substantial spoils.

The city was saved only by an outbreak of dysentery among the Rus'. Ibn Miskawaih writes that the Rus' "indulged excessively in the fruit of which there are numerous sorts there. This produced an epidemic among them . . . and their numbers began thereby to be reduced." Encouraged by the epidemic among the Rus', the Muslims approached the city. The Rus', their chief riding on a donkey, made an unsuccessful sally after which they lost 700 warriors but evaded encirclement and retreated to the Bardha'a fortress, where they were besieged by the Muslims. Exhausted by the disease and the siege, the Rus' "left by night the fortress in which they had established their quarters, carrying on their backs all they could of their treasure, gems, and fine raiment, boys and girls as they wanted, and made for the Kura River, where the ships in which they had issued from their home were in readiness with their crews, and 300 Russes whom they had been supporting with portions of their booty." The Muslims then exhumed from the Rus' graves the weapons that had been buried beside the warriors.

George Vernadsky proposed that Oleg of Novgorod was the donkey-riding chief of the Rus' who attacked Bardha'a. Vernadsky identified Oleg with Helgu, a figure mentioned in the Schechter Letter. According to that document, Helgu went to Persia by boat and died there after a failed attack on Constantinople in 941. On the other hand, Lev Gumilev, drawing on the name of the Rus' leader (as recorded in Arabian sources), hypothesizes that this leader was Sveneld, a Varangian chieftain whose wealth was noted in the Primary Chronicle under 945. (Note: The Kievan chronicle mentions that the fabulous richness of Sveneld's troops (druzhina) incited such envy of Igor's warriors that they attempted to levy tribute from the Drevlians for the second time in one month. The Drevlians revolted and killed Igor in 944 or 945. Gumilev suggests that, while engaged in his successful Caspian expedition, Sveneld did not take part in Igor's unfortunate raid on Constantinople, which ended ignominiously. This scenario also explains the glaring absence of Sveneld's name from Igor's treaty with Byzantium (944), as preserved in the Primary Chronicle.)

== Destruction of Khazaria ==
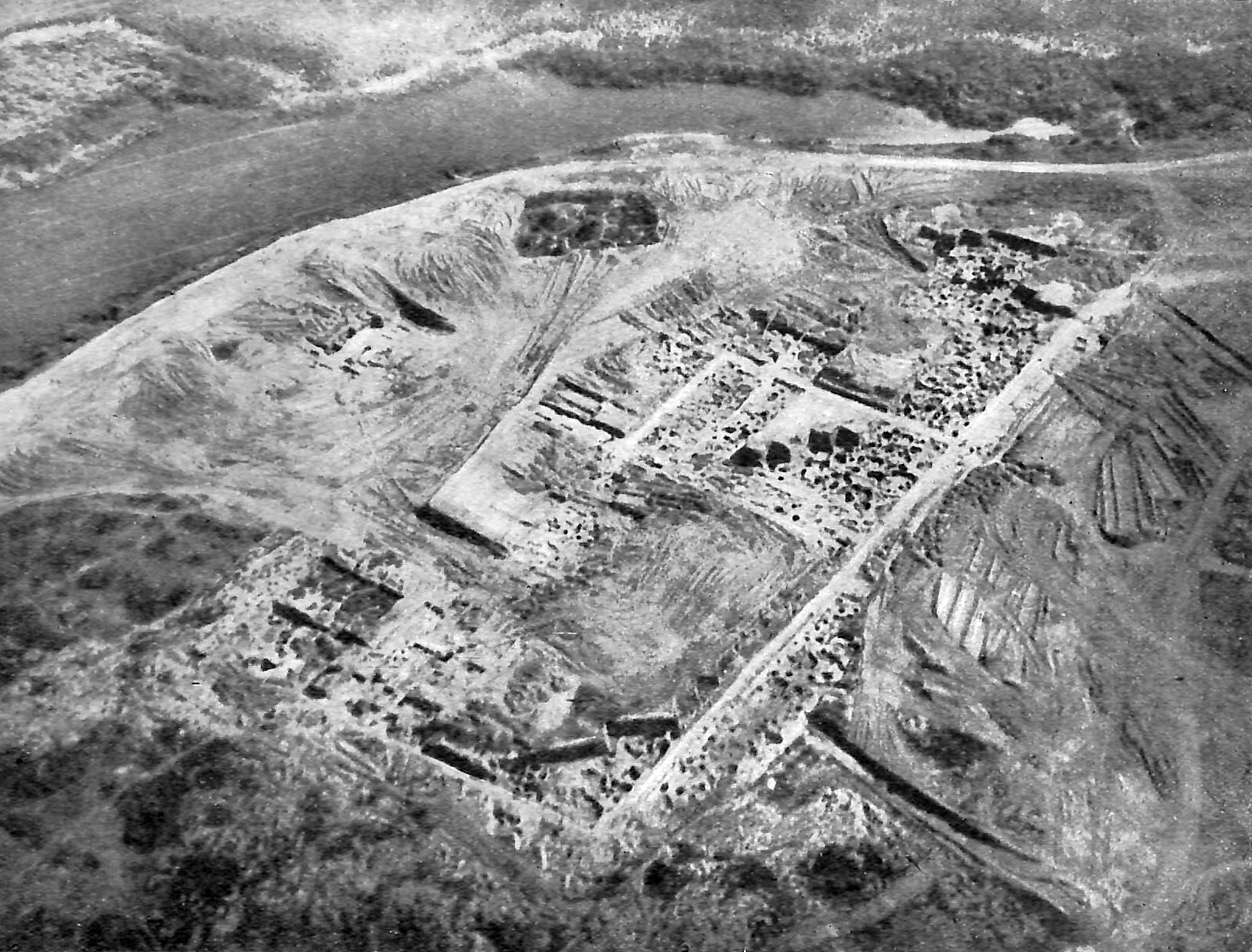
The site of the Khazar fortress at Sarkel, sacked by Sviatoslav c. 965. Aerial photo from excavations conducted by Mikhail Artamonov in the 1930s.

The sources are not clear about the roots of the conflict between Khazaria and Rus', so several possibilities have been suggested. The Rus' had an interest in removing the Khazar hold on the Volga trade route because the Khazars collected duties from the goods transported by the Volga. The conflict may have been spurred by the Khazars' decision to close passage down the Volga in response to the raid of 943. In the Khazar Correspondence, written around 950–960, the Khazar ruler Joseph reported his role as defender of the Muslim polities of the Caspian region against Rus' incursions: "I have to wage war with them [Rus], for if I would give them any chance at all they would lay waste the whole land of the Muslims as far as Baghdad." Earlier conflict between Muslim elements of the Khazar army and Rus' marauders in c. 912 may have contributed to this arrangement and the hostility of the Rus' against Khazaria.

In 965, Sviatoslav I of Kiev finally went to war against Khazaria. He employed Oghuz and Pecheneg mercenaries in this campaign, perhaps to counter the Khazars' superior cavalry. Sviatoslav destroyed the Khazar city of Sarkel around 965, and possibly sacked (but did not occupy) the Khazar city of Kerch on the Crimea. He subsequently (probably in 968 or 969) destroyed the Khazar capital of Atil. A visitor to Atil wrote soon after Sviatoslav's campaign: "The Rus' attacked, and no grape or raisin remained, not a leaf on a branch." Ibn Hawqal is the only author who reports the sack of Semender, after which the Rus' departed for "Rûm and al-Andalus". (Note: Ibn Hawkal also wrote that the Rus', "are the ones who of old went to Andalus and then to Barda." The earlier attack on Muslim Spain by "a nation of the Majus" [Muslim name for Zoroastrians and occasionally other pagans] is mentioned by al-Masudi.)

Sviatoslav's campaign brought the prosperity and independence of Khazaria to an abrupt end. The destruction of Khazar imperial power paved the way for Kievan Rus' to dominate north-south trade routes through the steppe and across the Black Sea, routes that formerly had been a major source of revenue for the Khazars. Moreover, Sviatoslav's campaigns led to increased Slavic settlement in the region of the Saltovo-Mayaki culture, greatly changing the demographics and culture of the transitional area between the forest and the steppe.

== Later expeditions ==
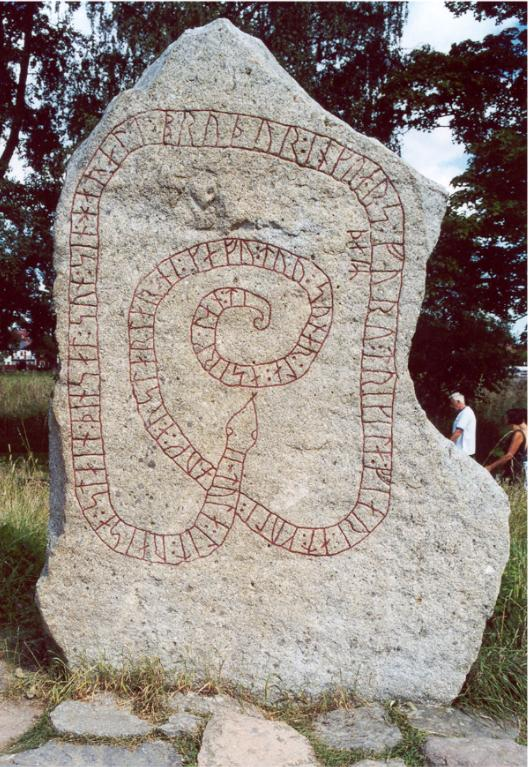
The Gripsholm Runestone commemorates Scandinavians who died in the expedition of Ingvar the Far-Travelled.

In 987, Maymun, emir of Derbent, asked the Rus' to help him against local chiefs. The Rus', many of whom appear to have been professional soldiers, arrived on 18 ships. Uncertain of their reception, they sent only one ship to reconnoitre the situation. When its crew were massacred by the local population, the Rus' went on to loot the city of Maskat. In 989, this same Maymun is reported to have refused the demand of a local preacher to turn over his Rus' mercenaries to him for either conversion to Islam or death. In the ensuing struggle, Maymun was driven from the city and forced to surrender the Rus' soldiers, but he returned in 992.

In 1030, the Rus' raided the region of Shirvan; the ruler of Ganja then paid them much money to help suppress a revolt in Beylagan. Afterwards, the Rus' returned home. According to one source, in November 1031 the Rus' returned, but were defeated near Baku and expelled. The year of 1032 saw another Rus' raid into Shirvan; they were joined by the Alans and Sarir. Local Muslims defeated the Rus' in 1033. It is unclear to which Rus' grouping these raiders belonged. Omeljan Pritsak suggests that they operated out of a base near the Terek estuary and had their principal home in Tmutarakan. Pritsak also speculated that the Rus', operating from the Caspian basin, shortly thereafter lent support to the Oghuz in a power struggle in Khwarezm.

In 1042, Ingvar the Far-Travelled led an unsuccessful large Viking attack against Persia with a fleet of 200 ships (around 15–20 thousand men). The legendary saga Yngvars saga víðförla describes the last expedition of the Vikings led by Ingvar the Far-Travelled into the Caspian, dated to 1041 and possibly connected with the Georgian-Byzantine Battle of Sasireti in which a Varangian force participated around the same time; in the saga much legend is conflated with the historical facts. This expedition was launched from Sweden and went down the Volga into the land of the Saracens (Serkland in Norse). There are no less than twenty-six Ingvar Runestones, twenty-three of them being in the Lake Mälaren region of Uppland in Sweden, referring to Swedish warriors who went out with Ingvar on his expedition to the Saracen lands, an expedition whose purpose was probably to reopen old trade routes, now that the Bulgars and the Khazars no longer proved obstacles. A stone to Ingvar's brother indicates that he went east for gold but that he died in the Saracen land. Afterwards, no attempts were made by the Norsemen to reopen the route between the Baltic and Caspian seas.

Perhaps some of the Rus settled in the region based on the History of Irkhan in which the inhabitants of Hadar and Avar (Avars) are called purebred Rus.

Khaqani tells about the invasion of Shirvan in 1173 or 1174. In his odes, Khaqani names the Rus' and Khazars, Rus' and Alans, Rus' and Sarir as the invaders. Peter Golden argued that the Rus' mentioned by Khaqani were Volga pirates who came in 73 ships. Yevgeni Pakhomov and Vladimir Minorsky thought the invasion was initiated by the ruler of Darbent, Bek-Bars b. Muzaffar. According to Minorsky, "the initiative of Bek-Bars was independent of Kiev, and he must have used bands of free-lances (бродники) who were roaming in the south, as a prototype of the future Cossacks". The shirvanshah Ahsitan I turned to the Georgian king, George III for aid and a combined army, which also included the future Byzantine emperor Andronikos Komnenos, defeated the invaders and recaptured the fortress of Shabaran. Georgian sources speak of the Khazars, but do not mention Rus' in connection with this event.

== See also ==
- Byzantine expeditions of the Rus'
- Paphlagonian expedition of the Rus'
- Ingvar the Far-Travelled
- List of wars involving Russia
- List of wars involving Sweden
- List of wars involving Ukraine

== Bibliography ==
- Artamonov, Mikhail (1962). Istoriya Khazar. Leningrad, LCCN 63-66080. See also second edition (2002) ISBN 5-8465-0032-3
- Barthold, W. (1996). "Khazar". Encyclopaedia of Islam (Brill Online). Eds.: P. Bearman, Th. Bianquis, C.E. Bosworth, E. van Donzel and W.P. Heinrichs. Brill.
- Brøndsted, Johannes (1965). The Vikings. (transl. by Kalle Skov). Penguin Books, LCCN 65-2868
- Christian, David (1999). A History of Russia, Mongolia and Central Asia: Inner Eurasia from Prehistory to the Mongol Empire (History of the World, Vol 1). Blackwell. ISBN 0-631-20814-3
- Dunlop, Douglas Morton (2006) "Bardha'a." Encyclopaedia of Islam (Brill Online). Eds.: P. Bearman, Th. Bianquis, C.E. Bosworth, E. van Donzel and W.P. Heinrichs. Brill.
- Dunlop, Douglas Morton (1954). History of the Jewish Khazars. Princeton University Press, LCCN 52-13163
- Golden, P.B. (2006) "Rus." Encyclopaedia of Islam (Brill Online). Eds.: P. Bearman, Th. Bianquis, C.E. Bosworth, E. van Donzel and W.P. Heinrichs. Brill.
- Logan, F. Donald (1992). The Vikings in History. Second edition. Abingdon: Routledge. ISBN 0-415-08396-6.
  - Logan, F. Donald (2005). The Vikings in History. Third edition. Abingdon: Routledge. p. 224. ISBN 9781136527166.
- Minorsky, Vladimir (1945), "Khāqānī and Andronicus Comnenus". Bulletin of the School of Oriental and African Studies, University of London, Vol. 11, No. 3: 550–578
- Noonan, Thomas Schaub (1987–1991). "When Did Rus/Rus' Merchants First Visit Khazaria and Baghdad?" Archivum Eurasiae Medii Aevi 7, pp. 213–219.
- Pletneva, Svetlana (1990). Polovtsy Moscow: Nauka, ISBN 5-02-009542-7
- Thunberg, Carl L. (2010). Ingvarståget och dess monument. Göteborgs universitet. CLTS. ISBN 978-91-981859-2-8, ISBN 978-91-637-5724-2
- Thunberg, Carl L. (2011). Särkland och dess källmaterial. Göteborgs universitet. CLTS. ISBN 978-91-981859-3-5, ISBN 978-91-637-5727-3
- Vernadsky, George (1959). The Origins of Russia. Oxford, Clarendon Press, LCCN 59-1228
- Zuckerman, Constantine (1995). "On the Date of the Khazar's Conversion to Judaism and the Chronology of the Kings of the Rus Oleg and Igor." Revue des Études Byzantines 53: 237–270.
