= Siege of Derbent =

1173/1174 siege

- Part of the Caspian expeditions of the Rus'
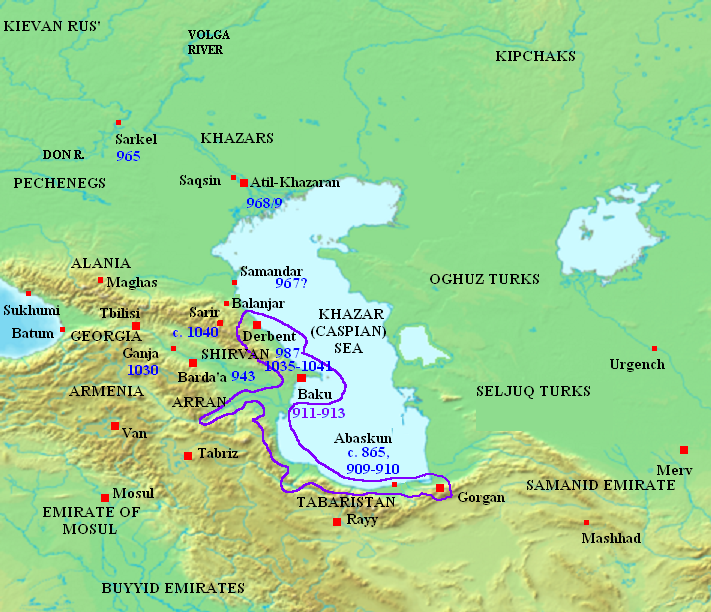
- Map showing the locations of major Rus' raids around the Caspian Sea.
Date	1173/1174
Location	Derbent, Alania
Result	Georgian and Shirvanshahr victory

Belligerents
Kingdom of Georgia: Shirvan	Rus'; Alans; Kipchaks

Commanders and leaders
Akhsitan I George III; Andronicus	Bek-Bars b. Muzaffar

Strength
Unknown	73 ships

Siege of Derbent in 1173 or 1174 was a successful siege of Derbent, by the Shirvanese and Georgian allies against Rus', Alan and Kipchak raiders.

== History ==
Akhsitan I's reign saw raids of Rus' which sailed from Volga and threatening shores of river Kura. They crossed the Caspian Sea on 73 ships and, having dropped anchor near island Ruinas (Sari), went up the Kura to Lemberana. At the same time, the Kipchaks occupied Derbent and, having proceeded to the south, occupied the citadel Shabran. During the period Sharvan had established close matrimonial ties with the Christian Kingdom of Georgia, and the Georgian kings had several times supported Sharvan in its struggle against al-Bab (Derbent). Akhsitan called his ally George III of Georgia, which in 1173 or 1174 accompanied the Georgian army on an expedition to Shirvan up to the Caspian shores, where George with the future Byzantine emperor Andronicus recaptured the fortress of Shabaran from the invaders from Dernemt for his cousin, the Shirvanshah Akhsitan I and strengthened the Georgian dominance in the area.

Yevgeni Pakhomov and Vladimir Minorsky thought the invasion was initiated by the ruler of Darbent, Bek-Bars b. Muzaffar. According to Minorsky, "the initiative of Bek-Bars was independent of Kiev, and he must have used bands of free-lances (Brodnici) who were roaming in the south, as a prototype of the future Cossacks". Georgian sources speak of the Khazars, but do not mention Rus' in connection with this event. Peter Golden argued that the Rus' mentioned by Khaqani were Volga pirates who came in 73 ships.

== Works cited ==
- Golden, P. B. (1995). "Rūs". In Bosworth, C.E.; van Donzel, E.; Heinrichs, W.P.; Lecomte, G. (eds.). The Encyclopedia of Islam. Vol. VIII (2nd ed.). Leiden: E.J. Brill. pp. 618–629. ISBN 90-04-09834-8.
- Minorsky, V. (1945). "Khāqānī and Andronicus Comnenus". Bulletin of the School of Oriental and African Studies, University of London. 11 (3): 550–578. doi:10.1017/S0041977X0007227X. JSTOR 609336. S2CID 161748303.
