= Tillinge Runestone =

Viking age Swedish runestone

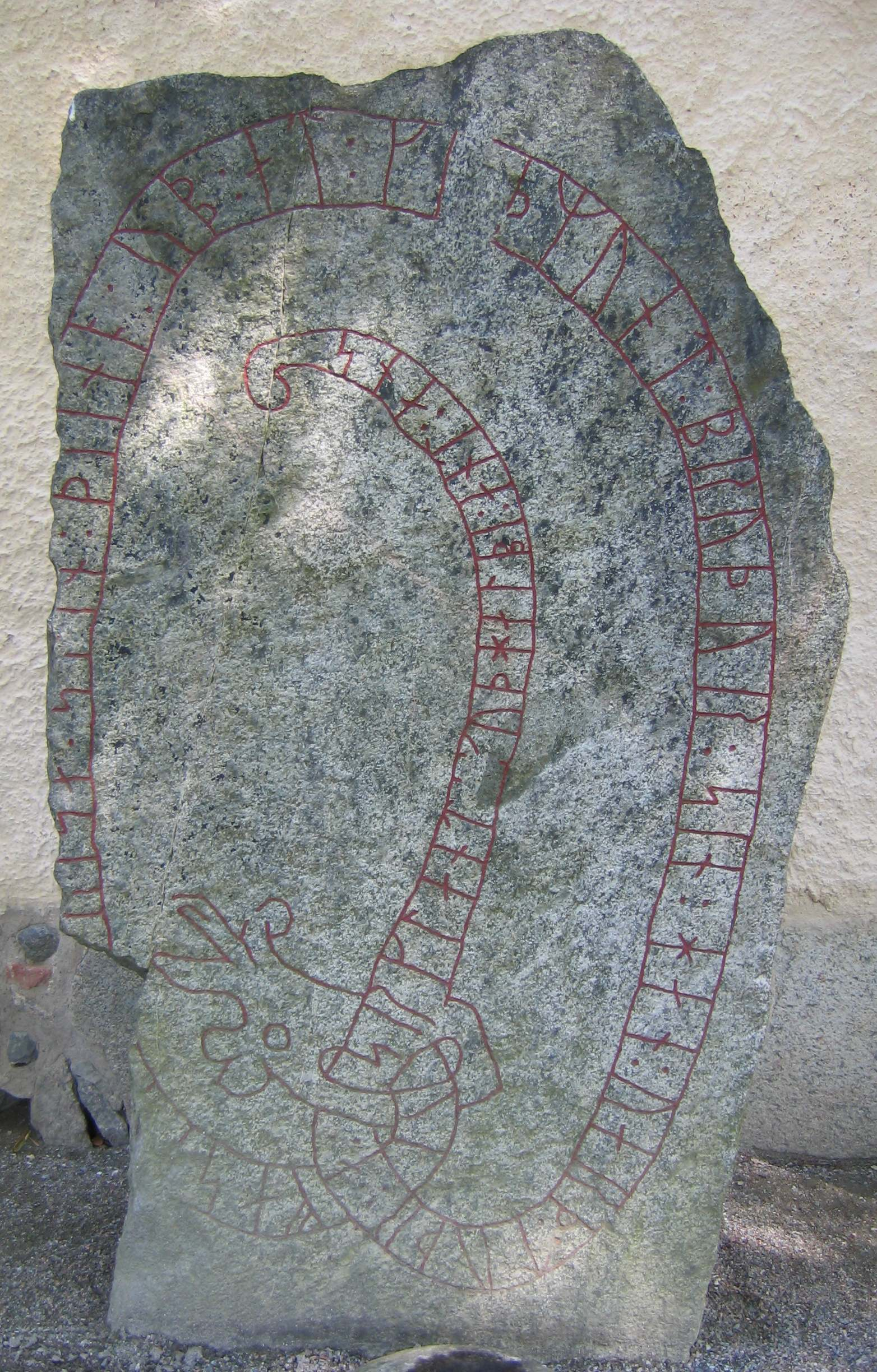
U 785 is a memorial to a man who died in Serkland.

The Tillinge Runestone, designated as U 785 under Rundata, is a Viking Age memorial runestone that was found at the church of Tillinge in Uppland, Sweden.

== Description ==
The Tillinge Runestone inscription consists of a runic text within a serpent. It was initially found within the church wall, but the full inscription could not be read until it was removed from the wall in 1946 and raised in front of the church. Many runestones were reused for materials in the construction of roads, bridges, walls, and buildings before their historical significance was understood. The inscription is dated as being from the first half of the 11th century and is in Old Norse and written using the younger futhark.

The Tillinge Runestone was raised by a man in memory of his brother who died in Serkland, and ends in a prayer for the brother's soul. It may be one of the Ingvar Runestones, but is not included in that group as it does not mention Ingvar the Far-Travelled, the leader of a Swedish Viking expedition to the Caspian Sea. As such, this runestone may be a memorial to a Varangian who died while in service in Asia.

The inscription is unsigned and has been attributed either to runemasters named Torbjörn or Gunnar. The inscription is classified as being carved in runestone style Pr1, which is also known as the Ringerike style.

== Inscription ==
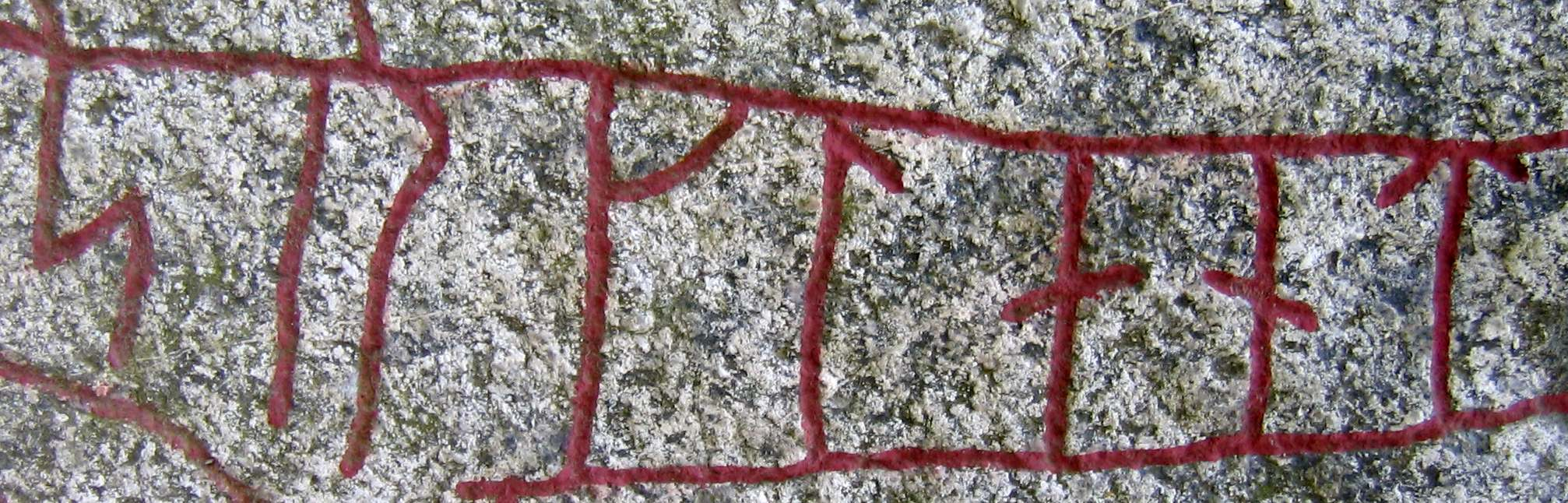
The runes for srklant or Serkland on the Tillinge Runestone.

=== Transliteration of the runes into Latin characters ===
uifas-- ... : risa : s(t)in : þ(t)ino : ub : at : k-þmunt : bruþur : sin : han : uarþ : tuþr : a : srklant- kuþ halbi : ant : ans

=== Transcription into Old Norse ===
Vifas[tr] [let] ræisa stæin þenna upp at G[u]ðmund, broður sinn. Hann varð dauðr a Særkland[i]. Guð hialpi and hans.

=== Translation in English ===
Véfastr had this stone raised up in memory of Guðmundr, his brother. He died in Serkland. May God help his spirit.

== See also ==
- List of runestones
- Varangian runestones
