= History of money circulation in Azerbaijan =

Money in the form of coins was first used in the territory of Azerbaijan in the time of Cyrus the Great first, then Alexander the Great as well as earlier, and continued under the Roman Empire and the Umayyad and Abbasid Caliphates.

In modern times the Republic of Azerbaijan has issued its own national currency during the period of independence from 1919 to 1936, and again since 1992. The unit of currency is the manat.

== Money in ancient states in the territory of Azerbaijan ==
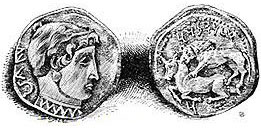
Coins minted in the name of Alexander the Great

As a result of archaeological investigations, the analysis of numismatic materials reveals that money circulation in the territory of Azerbaijan existed in the 7th-6th centuries BC. According to Yevgeni Pakhomov, monetary circulation in Albania appeared in the beginning of the 3rd century BC. The money here was silver drachma and tetradrachma on behalf of Alexander the Great, minted in Syria, Mesopotamia and Asia. At the end of the 3rd century BC - early in the 2nd century BC, due to the development of monetary relations in Albania, demand for coins increased and domestic mints began to function. Silver coins similar to Alexander the Great coins were minted here. The portrait of Alexander the Great was described on the surface of the coin and on the back side there was a description of Zeus. In the subsequent periods, Selevki, Frakia, Vflnia, Pontus, Bactrian, and Athenian coins were used in Albania's monetary circulation.

Beginning in the 2nd century BC, the Roman coins had also been included in the Albanian territory. After the Arab invasion of Azerbaijan in the 7th century, Azerbaijan joined the Caliphate's currency circulation.

== First national currency ==
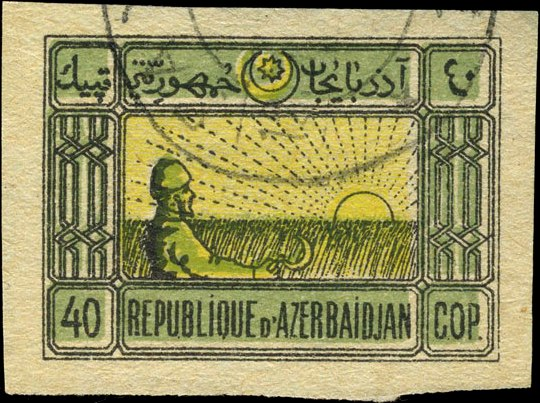
Money unit of the Republic of Azerbaijan

The first independent money emission of the Republic of Azerbaijan, the first independent democratic state in the Muslim world, begins with the banknotes of 25, 50, 100 and 250 manat, issued in early 1919. There were expressions “Republic” on the surface and "Republic of Azerbaijan" in Russian on the back face of the banknote, as well as the value of the banknote and date of issue had been shown. The names of the currency units issued in 1919-1920 were manat in Azerbaijani and rubles in Russian. The main goal here was to increase the confidence of the population, who have been used for many years and who are still in circulation of Russian currency, gradually to the new national currency. At the same time, the economic policy of the Republic of Azerbaijan in this field was connected with the international recognition of national currency – manat. For this reason, having felt the support of the French government (partially, considering the French as an international language), the Republic considered that it is needed to inscribe the words on 500 manat banknotes in French language.

== Soviet-era banknotes ==
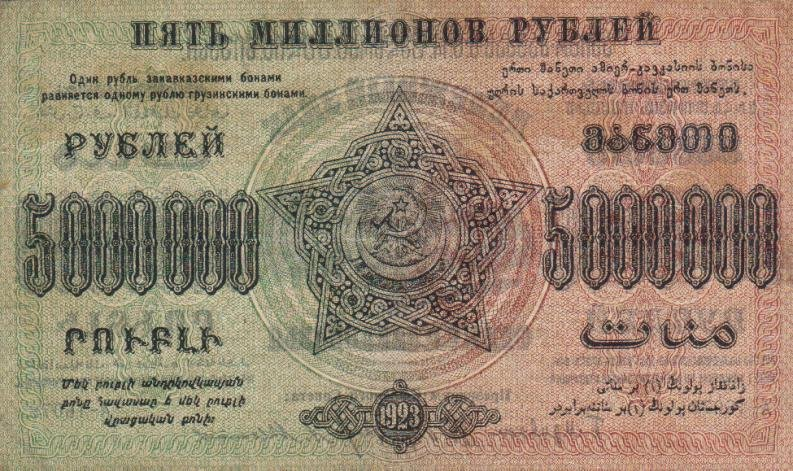

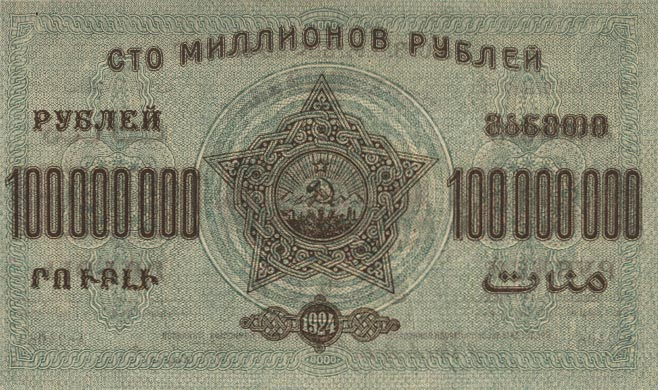

The second money emission in Azerbaijan was issued in 1920 on behalf of the Azerbaijan Soviet Socialist Republic (ASSR). Within the framework of this emission, the first bank note - 1,000 rubles (in large format and 1,000 (in small format) manats, and in 1921 - four new denominations - 5,000, 10,000, 25,000 and 50,000 manat banknotes were issued. As a result of the economic crisis that began in 1921, three new banknotes - in 100,000 (3 variants), 250,000 (2 variants) and 1,000,000 (2 variants) manat, and in early 1923 - 5,000,000 manat were put into circulation. All banknotes contain elements of state attributes, such as "star and crescent", "hammer and sickle", and the date on which they were issued. In 1923, the Soviet Union State Bank was established and its Baku branch was opened, thus the banking system of Azerbaijan began to be controlled from Moscow. In 1936, according to the Soviet Union Constitution, Azerbaijan entered the Soviet Union. The Azerbaijani branch of the State Bank of the Soviet Union operated until 1991 and Soviet ruble carried out the function of the single currency in the Soviet Union.

== The first national banknotes of independence ==
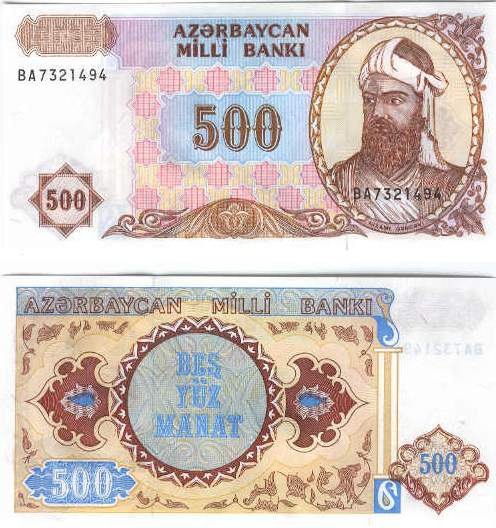
500 AZM (1993)

The independence of Azerbaijan at the end of the twentieth century made an environment to issue the national currency of the country. The first money emission of Azerbaijan was published by the Central Bank of France in 1992. The banknotes of 1 and 10 manat were issued in the new design. For the purpose to regulate cash circulation and to optimize the demand for cash, the Central Bank of Azerbaijan put 10,000 manat and in 1996 - 50,000 manat banknotes into circulation in 1994. The general appearance of the Palace of the Shirvanshahs had been described on the 10,000-manat banknote issued by Giesecke & Devrient in Germany in 1994. The banknotes of 50,000 manat issued by the British company De La Rue have been put into circulation since 1996 and the architectural monument in Nakhchivan - Momine Khatun Mausoleum had been described on them. In 2001, in the UK De La Rue issued 1000 manat banknote in a new design. This note is devoted to oil extraction and production in Azerbaijan.

== Circulation of new banknotes ==
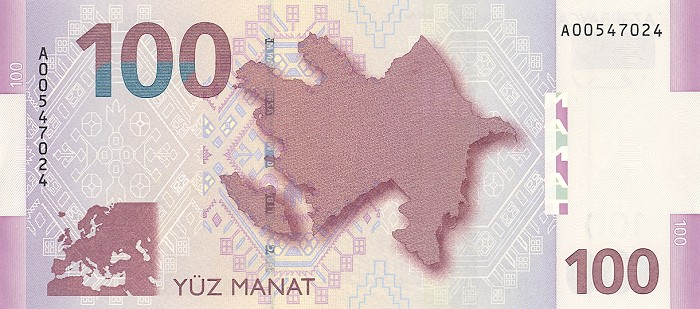
100 AZN (2006)

On February 7, 2005, the President of the Republic of Azerbaijan signed the Decree "On Changing the nominal value of money instruments and the scale of prices in the Republic of Azerbaijan".

According to the decree, from January 1, 2006 1 new AZN was equal to 5,000 AZM.

AZM and AZN jointly have been in circulation for 1 year - in 2006, and only from January 1, 2007, a full transition to the new manat was provided.

The new manat for circulation consisted of 1, 5, 10, 20, 50, 100 denomination and 1, 3, 5, 10, 20, 50 metal coins.

== Source ==
- Azərbaycan pullari ("Money of Azerbaijan"), Office of the President of the Republic of Azerbaijan.
