= Ingvar expedition =

Swedish Viking Age event

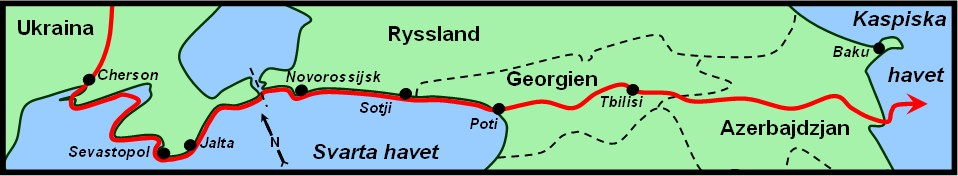
Probable route for the latter part of the Ingvar Expedition, with modern places marked. The route led to the Caspian Sea and into the area called Serkland by the Vikings.

The Ingvar expedition (Swedish: Ingvarståget) is the Swedish Viking Age event that is mentioned on a large amount of preserved runestones. About twenty-six Ingvar runestones in Sweden refer to Swedish Viking warriors who travelled east with Ingvar on his expedition to Serkland, or the Saracen lands. The expedition started in the second half of the 1030s and ended catastrophically in the year 1041, according to several Icelandic Annals, and was later the object for an Icelandic saga in the 12th century; the Yngvars saga víðförla. The Ingvar expedition seems to have been organized mainly on the basis of today's Svealand. King at the time was Anund Jakob.

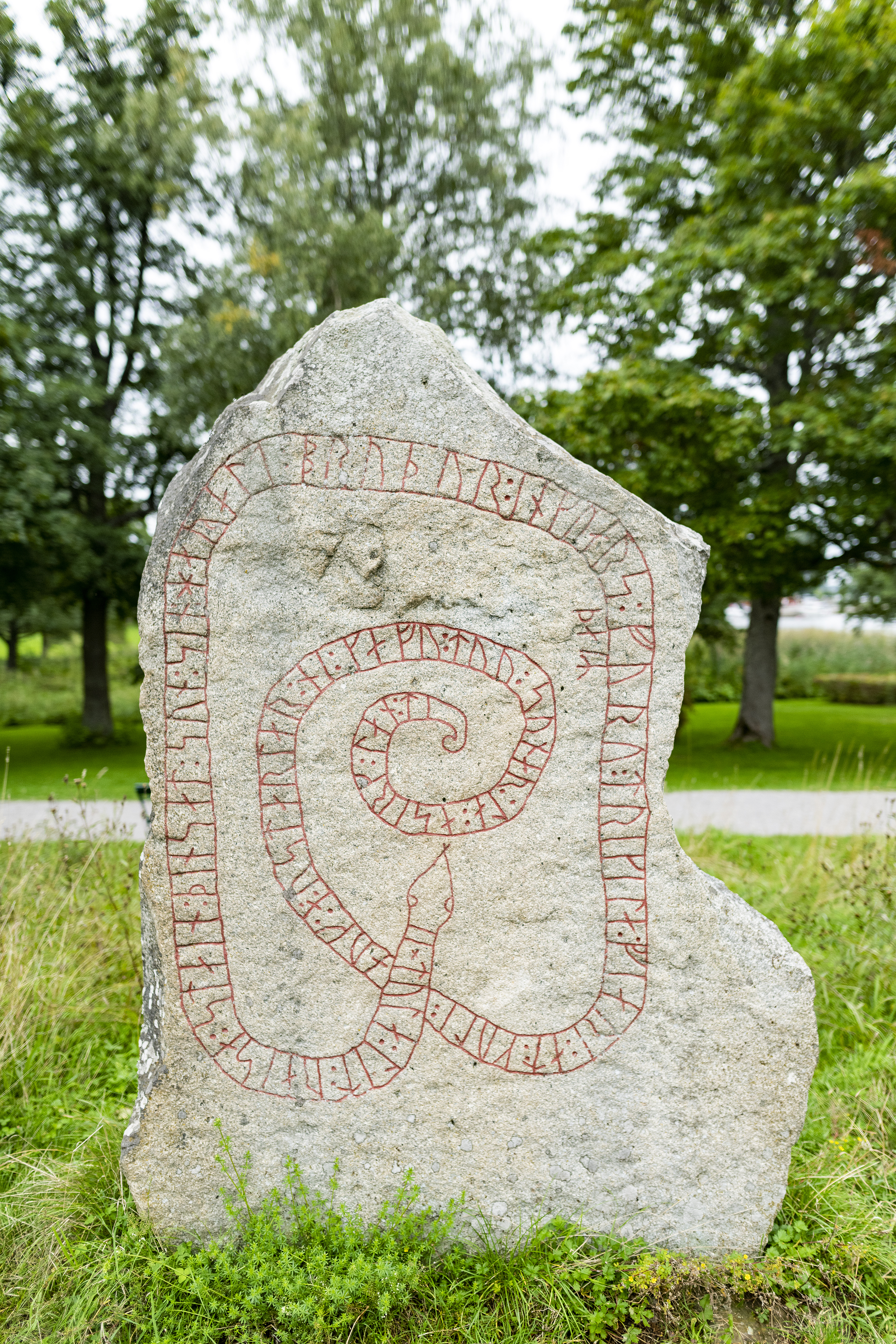
Runestone Sö 179

One of the most famous of the Ingvar runestones is the Gripsholm Runestone (Sö 179). Its inscription tells that it was raised in honour of Ingvar’s brother Haraldr who had died in Serkland.

Its runic inscription reads as follows:

Latin transliteration:

× tula : lit : raisa : stain : þinsa| |at : sun : sin : haralt : bruþur : inkuars : þaiʀ furu : trikila : fiari : at : kuli : auk : a:ustarla| |ar:ni : kafu : tuu : sunar:la : a sirk:lan:ti

Runic Swedish transcription:

Tōla lēt ræisa stæin þennsa at sun sinn Harald, brōður Ingvars.

Þæiʀ fōru drængila
fiarri at gulli
ok austarla
ærni gāfu,
dōu sunnarla
ą̄ Særklandi.

English translation:

"Tóla had this stone raised in memory of her son Haraldr, Ingvar's brother. They travelled manfully far for gold, and in the east gave (food) to the eagle. (They) died in the south in Serkland."
