= Yngvars saga víðförla =

Norse legendary saga

Yngvars saga víðförla (also known as Sagan om Ingwar Widtfarne och hans Son Swen) is a legendary saga said to have been written in the twelfth century by Oddr Snorrason. The tale tells of the Ingvar expedition by Vikings to somewhere in southern Russia, probably the present day region of Georgia in the Caucasus.

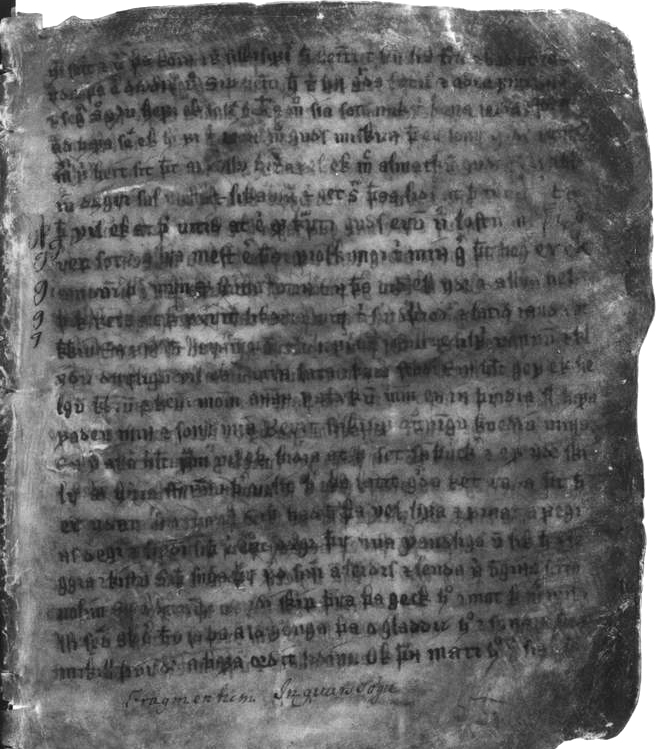
Yngvars saga víòförla

== Description ==
It describes what was the last Viking campaign in the Caspian (Caspian Sea) in 1041, adding much legend to the historical facts. This expedition was launched from Sweden by Ingvar the Far-Travelled (Ingvar Vittfarne), who went into the land of the Saracens (Serkland). There, they apparently took part in the Battle of Sasireti in Georgia (1042).

=== Publication history ===
The earliest extant text is dated to the early 15th century, and is thought to be an Icelandic translation of a Latin text, now lost; the Latin version may have been written by Oddr Snorrason at Þingeyraklaustur in the years preceding 1200. In 1920 Finnur Jónsson only attributed Óláfs saga Tryggvasonar to Oddr, but the authorship claim has gained more acceptance over time, with the attribution to 'Odda the Wise' now thought to be the same as Oddr Snorrason. Key arguments for the attribution were made by (Hofmann 1981) - one such was that both 'Oddr' and 'Odda' mention one Gizurr Hallsson as recipients of Olaf's saga and Yngvar's saga.

The story was published in 1762 by N.R. Brocman (Stockholm) as Sagan om Ingwar Widtfarne och hans Son Swen [The Saga of Ingvar Widtfarne and his son Swen].

=== Physical and historical evidence ===
There are many Ingvar Runestones raised in commemoration of warriors who died in the raid, mostly in the Lake Mälaren region of Uppland in Sweden. A stone to Ingvar's brother indicates that he went east for gold but that he died in Saracen land. It has been noted that the names of several figures in the saga are shared by people mentioned on the Ingvar Runestones.

Evidence both archaeological and literary is convincing for a Viking (or 'rus') presence in the Caucasus and or Caspian region in the period dated in the tale, as well as substantial circumstantial evidence that may directly related to the events in the tale, including 11th century Arabic sources. The interchange between Scandinavia and Russia, as well as a 'rus' presence, both trading and mercenary, in that region (and in Byzantium) in the period was substantial. Some scholars have attempted to identify the saga with Viking (rus) journeys to Byzantium in 1043, not the Caspian in 1041, or even with 'rus' raids on Emirs of the Caucasus between 1030 and 1033.

The Georgian Chronicles confirm the presence of Varangians (Norsemen) in the area c.1040, though the dating is not completely precise; the chronicles give more details on the activities of a small army of Varangians, and though similarities can be drawn with the saga, a direct association between the two records is not certain, and a very selective interpretive reading is needed to get the two to fit. (Larsson 1986) further analyzed the two historical accounts - he saw no reason not to conflate the two accounts - finding chronological order matches between the saga text, and likely inferred journey to Georgia, and the historical events - and suggests that the alternative of the Georgian account referring to another 'Viking' expedition is relatively unlikely.

One argument for the theory that the journey was to Byzantium (and not the Caspian) is supported by references to fire being used against their ships and the knowledge of "Greek fire" by the Byzantines, which is recorded to have been used in such a way in 1043.

== Source material ==
The saga also draws on learned literature, including the late twelfth-century translation of The Book of Joseph and Aseneth.

== Sources ==
- Jensson, Gottskálk, MNLL (Medieval Nordic Literature in Latin): Oddr monachus
- Logan, Donald F. (1992), The Vikings in History (2nd ed.), Routledge, ISBN 0-415-08396-6
- Hofmann, Dietrich (1981), Die Yngvars saga viðforla und Oddr munkr inn fróði [Yngvar's saga and Oddr the Wise] (in Icelandic)
- Shepard, Jonathan (1982–1985), "Yngvarr's Expedition to the East and a Russian Inscribed Stone Cross" (PDF), Saga-Book, vol. XXI, pp. 222–292
- Larsson, Mats G. (1986–1989), "Yngvarr's Expedition and the Georgian Chronicle" (PDF), Saga-Book, vol. XXII, pp. 98-
- McGinnis, Deborah I. (1983), Laine, Edward W. (ed.), "The Vikings in the East: Ingvars sagavíðförla" (PDF), SCANDINAVIAN CANADIAN STUDIES SELECTION FROM THE PAPERS PRESENTED AT THE FIRST ANNUAL MEETING HELD AT OTTAWA 1982 [ÉTUDES SCANDINAVES AU CANADA], pp. 79–86
- Ross, Margaret Clunies (2000), Old Icelandic Literature and Society, Cambridge University Press, ISBN 0-521-63112-2
- Snorrason, Oddr (2003), Andersson, Theodore M. (ed.), The Saga of Olaf Tryggvason, Cornell University Press, ISBN 0-8014-4149-8

=== Texts ===
- Sagan om Ingwar widtfarne och hans son Swen (in Swedish), 1762 , scanned pages, alt link
- Jónsson, G.; Vilhjákmsson, B., "Yngvars saga víðförla", Fornaldarsögur Norðurlanda (in Old Norse)
- YNGVARS SAGA VÍÐFÖRLA (in Old Norse)
- Tunstall, Peter, ed. (2003), The Saga of Yngvar the Traveler, archived from the original on 20 February 2005 , translation
- Pálsson, Hermann; Edwards, Paul (1989), Vikings in Russia : Yngvar's saga and Eymund's saga, Edinburgh : Edinburgh University Press
- Olson, Emil (1912), Yngvars saga víðförla : jämte ett bihang om ingvarsinskrifterna, Køben
