= Ingvar the Far-Travelled =

11th-century Swedish Viking

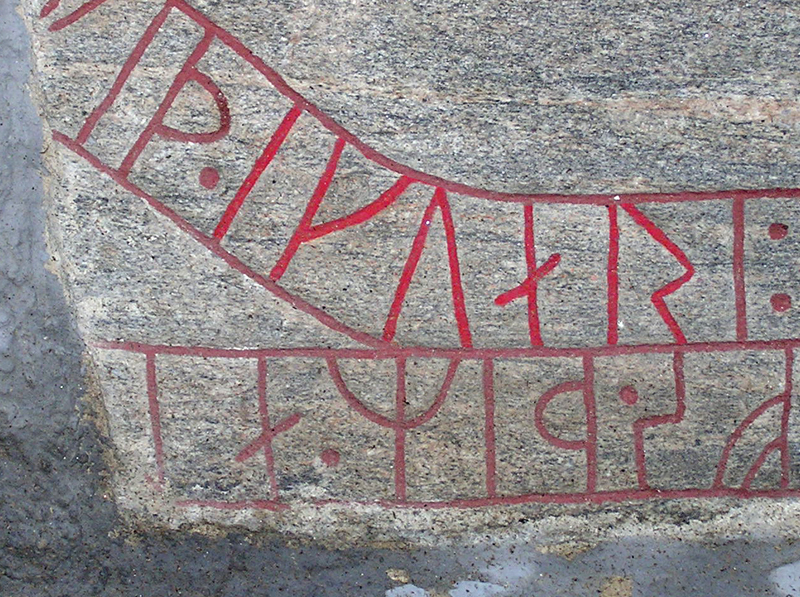
The runes ikuari, dative singular of Ingvarr, on runestone Sö 281

Ingvar the Far-Travelled (Old Norse: Yngvarr víðfǫrli, Swedish: Ingvar Vittfarne) was a Swedish Viking who led an expedition that fought in the Kingdom of Georgia.

The Rus' undertook several Caspian expeditions in the course of the 10th century. The Yngvars saga víðförla describes the last Viking campaign in the Caspian in 1041, embellishing the historical facts with a great deal of legend. The expedition probably aimed to reopen old trade-routes after the Volga Bulgars and the Khazars no longer proved obstacles. Ingvar the Far-Travelled launched this expedition from Sweden, travelling down the Volga River into the land of the Saracens (Serkland). While there, the Vikings apparently took part in the 1042 Battle of Sasireti between the Georgians and Byzantines.

No less than twenty-six Ingvar runestones – twenty-four of them in the Lake Mälaren region of Uppland in Sweden – refer to Swedish warriors who went out with Ingvar on his expedition to the Saracen lands. A stone to Ingvar's brother indicates that he went east for gold but died in Saracen land.

== Sources ==
Aside from the Ingvar runestones, there are no surviving Swedish sources that mention Ingvar, but there is the Yngvars saga víðförla and three Icelandic annals which mention his death under the year 1041: "Annales Regii", the "Lögmanns Annals" and the "Flateyarbók Annals". These three annals are probably based on Sturla Þórðarson's compilation. Swedish archeologist and historian Mats G. Larsson notes that The Georgian Chronicles mentions a visit from a Viking expedition in the year 1040, which correlates with the description of such a meeting in Yngvars saga víðförla.

== Life ==
=== Origin ===
There are three theories on Ingvar's origin. According to one theory, prominently held by Otto von Friesen and Elena Mel'nikova, Ingvar's saga has transmitted his origin correctly, and so he was the son of the Varangian Eymundr, who in turn was the son of a Swedish chieftain named Áki and the daughter of the Swedish king Eric the Victorious.

A second theory suggests that Ingvar was the son of a Swedish prince named Eymundr, who would have been the son of Eric the Victorious and the brother of Olof Skötkonung. The existence of this prince Eymundr has been suggested by Lauritz Weibull (1911) and J. Svennung (1966). The theory is based on a re-evaluation of the age of the Ingvar runestones, proposed by Elias Wessén and Sune Lindquist, which suggests that the Ingvar runestones were carved earlier in the 11th century than previously believed.

According to a third theory, proposed by F. Braun, and which is based on the runestones U 513, U 540, Sö 179, and Sö 279, Ingvar was the son of the Swedish king Emund the Old and the grandson of Olof Skötkonung. Emund the Old would have had two wives, Tola and Ragnhildr. Tola would have been the mother of Haraldr of Sö 179, and Ragnhildr would have been the mother of Önundr, Eiríkr, Ragnarr, and Hákon of runestones U 513 and U 540. Önundr would be Anund Gårdske, who was raised in Russia, Eirík would be one of the two pretenders named Eric, Hákon would be Håkan the Red, and Ingvar would be Ingvar the Far-Travelled.

Ingvar's origin was, however, debated as early as the saga writers, or to put it in the words of Oddr Snorrason:

We do know that there are some saga tellers who say that Yngvarr was the son of [King] Önundr Óláfsson [d. 1060], because they think that it would be more honorable for him to be a king's son. And [they say that] Önundr would gladly give up all his realm if he had been allowed to bargain for Yngvarr's life, because all the chiefs in Sweden would gladly have had him [Yngvarr] as king over them.

=== Expedition ===
It is possible that it was King Anund Jakob or his brother and successor Emund the Old who mustered the Swedish leidang.

The participants were evenly distributed along the husbys, and 24 of the 26 Ingvar runestones were from Sweden (in the contemporary sense, i.e. Svealand) and the remaining two from the Geatish district of Östergötland. The folkland of Attundaland did not take part and this was probably done on purpose in order to keep a defensive army in Sweden while the main force was away.

Anund Jacob was the brother of Ingegerd Olofsdotter, who was married to Yaroslav I of Novgorod and who conquered Kiev in 1019 from his brother Sviatopolk. This was done with the help of the Varangians, and according to Ingvar's saga, they were led by Ingvar's father Eymund.

In 1030, he had visited Ani, the capital of the Armenian Kingdom. Later Yaroslav had trouble with the Pechenegs, a nomad tribe. The expedition stayed for a few years in Kiev fighting against the Pechenegs, then in 1042 continued to the Black Sea and the Christian country Särkland ("Land of the Saracens", which here meant Georgia), where they took part in the Battle of Sasireti along with the Georgian Royal Army against Georgian rebels and Byzantine auxiliaries.

== Aftermath ==
According to the legendary saga about Ingvar, only one ship returned. The 26 remaining runestones testify to this, as not one mentions a surviving combatant. The most common phrases are similar to the one on the Gripsholm Runestone:

They died in the East, in Serkland.

Adam of Bremen considered the disaster to be a punishment for the king's rejection of bishop Alvard of Bremen and his electing his bishop, Osmundus, instead. Larsson suggests that the expedition was partly decimated by combat and that the saga's description of them being ravished by disease is a realistic scenario.

Yngvars according to the saga had a son Svein. Svein also gathered a large armada of Swedish ships and sailed to Kievan Rus. Svein asked the East Slavic queen to have a church dedicated to his father Yngvar and declare Yngvar a saint. The Russian queen, however, declined and said only people performing miracles could be called a saint. Then Svein said that his father had god in his heart and served him his entire life and said that should be enough for sainthood. The Gårdariki queen then let the Swedes call this local church Yngvars church. However, he was not declared a saint. Svein married a local girl and settled down in Russia as a noble or king. Sven told before the marriage he could not marry a heathen girl. The Swedish priest did not speak East Slavic so Sven had to use an interpreter for her conversion ceremony and his marriage. The girl thought that Sven had beautiful eyes and wanted to kiss Sweyn. She however had to wait for the marriage ceremony and conversion ceremony until she could kiss him.

His expeditions into Russia went better after killing heathens and converting heathens his host of Swedish soldiers decided to settle down. Svein troops engaged in many wars in Kievan Rus against heathen nations and helped the Grand Prince of Kiev several times. After a long time, he arrived in his old homeland. He was treated as a hero when he arrived. With many Swedes admiring Svein. He and his men also apparently killed a dragon. They told so in the Swedish court.

Many Swedes even wanted Yngvars son Svein to be the next king of Sweden. He refused however his large host of soldiers decided to settle down in Kievan Rus' since the climate was more fruitful and the Swedish lands were barren and cold. Kettil the source of the saga said farewell to Sven. The last time he saw Sven he was sailing down the rivers of Russia. While Kettil returned to Iceland and told the tale.

== See also ==
- Vikings
- Varangians
- Caspian expeditions of the Rus'

== Sources ==
- Fischer, Svante (1999). Ingvarsstenarna i tid och rum.
- Kjartansson, Helgi Skúli (2002). "From the frying pan of oral tradition into the fire of saga writing: The precarious survival of historical fact in the saga of Yngvar the Far-Traveller". Some facts preserved in the story
- Larsson, Mats G. (1990). Ett ödesdigert vikingatåg: Ingvar den vittfarnes resa 1036–1041.
- Pritsak, Omeljan (1981). The Origin of Rus'. Cambridge, Massachusetts: Harvard Ukrainian Research Institute. ISBN 0-674-64465-4
- Thunberg, Carl L. (2010). Ingvarståget och dess monument: En studie av en runstensgrupp med förslag till ny gruppering.
- Tunstall, Peter (2005). The Saga of Yngvar the Traveller.
