= Abaskun =

Medieval port in the southeastern Caspian Sea

Abaskun was a port that existed in the Middle Ages on the southeastern shore of the Caspian Sea in the area of Gorgan.

== Location ==
In his Geographia, Ptolemy mentions a river Sokanda in Hyrcania, which may have given the name to the city. The exact location of Abaskun remains unclear; most likely, it was situated near the mouth of the Gorgan River. According to Arab geographers, Abaskun was within a one- or three-day journey from Gorgan. Its coordination's may be near to today's village of Khvajeh Nafas or Gomishan city 37°01′N 54°00′E

== History ==
Abaskun was a prosperous trading hub from which merchants travelled to Daylam, Derbent, and Atil in the land of Khazars on the Volga trade route. The city's products included shagreen, woolen cloth, fish, and seabirds' feathers, which were used for decorating garments. In the 10th century, Abaskun possessed a citadel built of fired brick and a congregational mosque in the market quarter. The city's wealth and vulnerable location made it a target of the Caspian expeditions of the Rus. The Rus staged their first small-scale raid on Abaskun sometime between 864 and 884, pillaging the city in 909 or 910 and again in 913 on a very large scale.

In 1220, Muhammad II of Khwarezm, the fugitive ruler of the Khwarezmid Empire, hid from the Mongols on an island near Abaskun. After that, the city is not mentioned in documents. In the 14th century, the Persian geographer Mostawfi wrote that Abaskun was an island which was submerged due to the rise of the Caspian Sea caused by a temporary change in the course of the Oxus, which briefly flowed into the Caspian instead of the Aral Sea.
