= Brodnici =

Tribe

The Brodnici (Russian: Бродники, Ukrainian: Бродники) were a tribe of disputed origin, noted in the 13th century as living in a territory located between modern Moldova, Romania and Ukraine.

== Etymology ==
In some opinions, the name, as used by foreign chronicles, means a person in charge of a ford (water crossing) in Slavic language (cf. Slavic brodŭ). The probable reason for the name is that the territory of the Brodniks constituted the link between the mountain passes in the Carpathians and the mouths of the Danube, having a major economical importance, assuring the access to the Genovese colonies. According to other opinions, their name is related to Slavic бродить ("to wander"), probably referring to the nomadic way of life of this population. Other opinions claim that the name came from the river Prut or from its purportedly old name Brutus.

== Territory ==
The territory of Brodnici consisted of the southwestern part of today's Republic of Moldova, the southern part of today's Vrancea and Galați counties of Romania, the southern part of Budjak in Ukraine and probably the coastline between the Dniester and the Dnieper.

== Ethnicity ==
Attempts have been made to associate them to better known neighbouring populations, different authors classifying them as Slavs or Iranian, or perhaps mixed ethnic stock: Romanian-Slavic or Turko-Slavic.

Some authors have identified them with the "Bordinians" mentioned by Byzantine chronicler Niketas Choniates as a branch of "Tauroscythians", a term apparently applying to the Rus people in order to distinguish them from the Cumans/Polovtsians and from Vlachs.

== Documentary evidence ==
In 1216, they were in the service of the knyaz of Suzdal.

In 1222, the Hungarian king Andrew II gave the Burzenland to the Teutonic Knights, delimiting it by the land of the Brodnici. A Papal bull of Pope Honorius III confirmed the charter in the same year; however, in the copy approved by the Vatican, "Brodnicorum" was replaced by "Blacorum" (i.e., "Vlachs" in Latin). While some historians believe that this shows that the terms were equivalent, others claim that this was just an error. The latter base their claim on the fact that the two terms were used together in several Hungarian documents, very unusual if referring to the same population.

In 1238, King Béla IV of Hungary presented himself as: king of "...Ruthenorum, Cumanorum, Brodnicorum...".

The Novgorod First Chronicle says that in 1223 the Brodnici took part in the Battle of Kalka on the side of Mongols ("Tatars").

When speaking about Brodniks, the Chronicle mentions voivode Ploskynya (the name of the voivode is sometimes rendered as Ploscânea in Romanian historiography) who deceived knyaz Mstislav Romanovich and delivered him to "Tatars". Some researchers conclude that Ploskynya was the Brodnik commander. According to some researchers, the Chronicle should be interpreted as "And there Brodniks were with Tatars, and their Voivod Ploskynya [...]". However other disagree, considering that the source should be translated as "And there Brodniks were with Tatars, and Voivod Ploskynya, [...]". After this date, they disappeared from Rus' sources.

In August 1227, Pope Gregory IX wrote a letter to the bishop of Esztergom instructing him to convert to Christianity "in Cumania et Bordinia terra illis vicina".

A November 11, 1250 letter of King Béla IV of Hungary to Pope Innocent IV says that Tatars imposed tribute onto the countries neighboring with his kingdom: "que ex parte Orientis cum regno nostro conterminantur, sicut Ruscia, Cumania, Brodnici, Bulgaria".
