= Yevgeni Pakhomov =

Azerbaijani archaeologist and numismatist

Yevgeni Alexandrovich Pakhomov (Russian: Евгений Александрович Пахомов; 1880–1965) was a Russian, Georgian and Azerbaijani numismatist and archaeologist and a recognized authority in the numismatics of the Caucasus.

== Biography ==
Born in Stavropol, he graduated from the Tiflis Realschule in 1896, the St. Petersburg Archeological Institute in 1900, and the St. Petersburg Technological Institute in 1902. In 1920, he helped to organize the Museum of Azerbaijani History and was elected to the Academic Association of the University of Baku where he chaired the Department of Archeology and Numismatics from 1922 to 1930. He attained to the title of Professor at the Azerbaijani State University in 1945, and chaired the Department of Archaeology there from 1947 to 1953. Pakhomov was granted the title of the Meritorious Scholar of the Azerbaijan SSR in 1955 and elected as a corresponding member of the Azerbaijani Academy of Sciences in 1962.

Pakhomov authored some of the most influential works on the numismatics of Georgia and Azerbaijan. His unique numismatic collections were bequeathed to the museums of Tbilisi, Baku, and Leningrad. Some coins were obtained by the Armenian museum, while others were acquired by private collectors.

Pakhomov is the author of Coins of Georgia, published in 1970.

The articles of Pakhomov are in the process of digitization and upload on the special page on academia.edu.
