= Serkland =

Old Norse name for Islamic lands

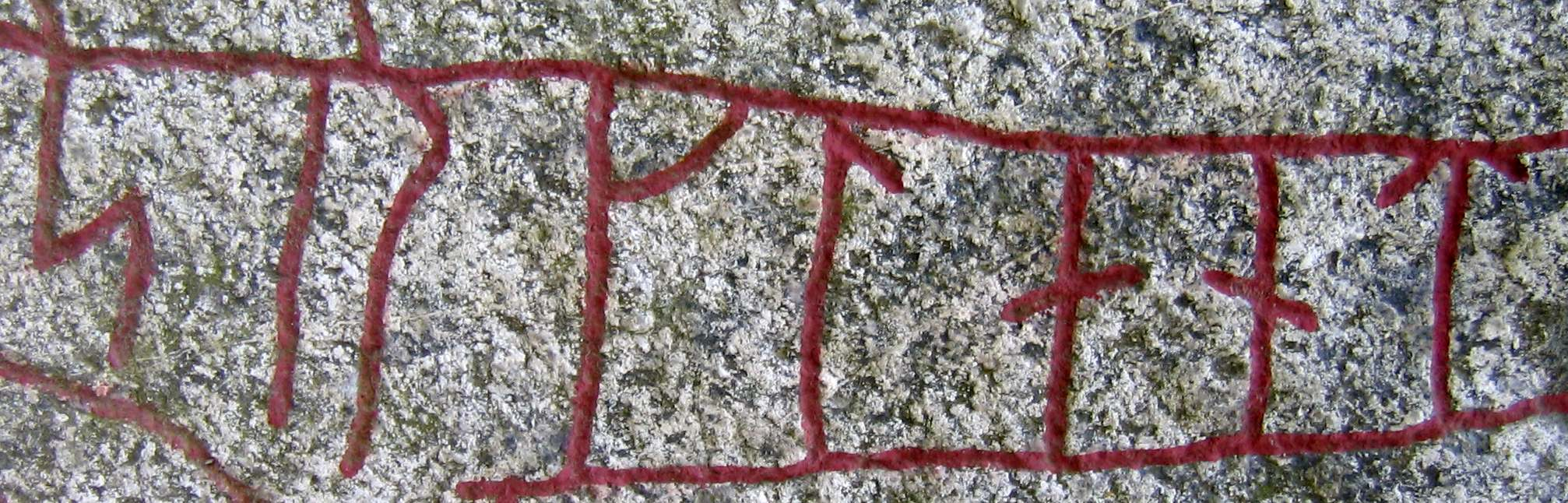
srklant on the Tillinge Runestone raised in memory of a Varangian who did not return from Serkland, at the church of Tillinge in Uppland, Sweden.

In Old Norse sources, such as sagas and runestones, Serkland (also Særkland, Srklant, Sirklant, Serklat, etc.) was the "land of the Serkir", usually identified with the Saracens.

The exact etymology is disputed. Serk- may derive from "Saracen"; from sericum, Latin for "silk", implying a connection with the Silk Road; from the Khazar fortress of Sarkel; or from serkr, shirt or gown, i.e., "land of the gown-wearers". In all cases it refers to a land in the East. Originally, it referred to the land south of the Caspian Sea, but it gradually expanded to cover all Islamic lands, including parts of Africa (and possibly even Muslim Sicily).

Notably one of the Ingvar runestones, the Sö 179, raised circa 1040 at Gripsholm Castle, commemorates a Varangian loss during an ill-fated raid in Serkland. The other remaining runestones that talk of Serkland are Sö 131, Sö 279, Sö 281, the Tillinge Runestone and probably the lost runestone U 439. For a detailed account of such raids, see Caspian expeditions of the Rus'.

Several sagas mention Serkland: Ynglinga saga, Sörla saga sterka, Sörla þáttr, Saga Sigurðar Jórsalafara, Jökulsþáttur Búasonar and Hjálmþés saga ok Ölvis. It is also mentioned by the 11th century skald Þórgils Fiskimaðr, and the 12th century skald Þórarinn Stuttfeldr.

== See also ==
- Garðaríki
- Names of Istanbul § Old Norse
- Vinland

== Literature ==
- Ture Johnsson Arne. Austr i Karusm och Särklandsnamnet. In Fornvännen 42, pp 290–305. Stockholm 1947.
- Sven B. F. Jansson. Runinskrifter i Sverige. Stockholm 1963.
- Carl L. Thunberg. Särkland och dess källmaterial. University of Gothenburg 2011.
- Carl L. Thunberg. Ingvarståget och dess monument University of Gothenburg 2010.
