= Çaykənd =

Çaykənd or Chaykend or Chaikend or Ch’ayk’end may refer to:

- Dprabak, Armenia
- Getik, Vayots Dzor, Armenia
- Getishen, Armenia
- Çaykənd, Dashkasan, Azerbaijan
- Çaykənd, Goygol, Azerbaijan
- Çaykənd, Kalbajar, Azerbaijan
- Çaykənd, Shaki, Azerbaijan
- Çaykənd, Shusha, Azerbaijan
- Yuxarı Çaykənd, Azerbaijan
