= Akunk (disambiguation) =

Akunk or Akunq may refer to:

- Akunk, Gegharkunik, Armenia
- Akunk, Aragatsotn, Armenia
- Akunk, Kotayk, Armenia
- Çaykənd, Shusha, Nagorno-Karabakh
