= List of marketing research firms =

This is a list of marketing research firms. In the case of research groups or conglomerates the location of the headquarters of the parent entity is given.

== Australia ==
- OzTAM
- Roy Morgan Research

== Belgium ==
- EyeSee Research

== Canada ==
- Abacus Data
- Léger Marketing
- Print Measurement Bureau

== China ==
- JETT customer experience

== France ==
- Ipsos
- MKG Group

== Germany ==
- GfK

== India ==
- IMRB International

== United Kingdom ==
- Datamonitor
- Dunnhumby
- Euromoney
- Ipsos MORI
- Kantar Group
- Mintel
- NUS Services
- Progressive Digital Media
- Pulsar
- Research International
- Survation
- Synovate
- Taylor Nelson Sofres (part of the Kantar Group)
- YouGov

== United States ==
- Arbitron
- Forrester Research
- Frost & Sullivan
- Gartner Group
- Hall & Partners
- Harris Interactive
- IMS Health
- International Data Corporation
- IRI
- J. D. Power and Associates
- KS&R
- NPD Group
- Nielsen
- Rockbridge Associates, Inc.
- StrategyOne
