= Bashgyukh (disambiguation) =

Bashgyukh may refer to:

- Bashgyukh, Shirak Province, Armenia
- Akunk, Kotayk, Armenia
- Saralanj, Shirak, Armenia
