= Barum =

Barum may refer to:

== Places ==
- Barum, Azerbaijan
- Barum, Lüneburg, a municipality in the district of Lüneburg, Lower Saxony, Germany
- Barum, Uelzen, a municipality in the district of Uelzen, Lower Saxony, Germany
- Barum, Sweden, a village where the Mesolithic Barum Woman was discovered in 1939
- Barum, a borough of the city of Salzgitter, Lower Saxony, Germany
- Barnstaple, Devon, UK, also known as Barum

== Other ==
- Barum (company), a manufacturer of tires, based in the Czech Republic
- Barum, a pottery mark used on works made by Brannam Pottery

== See also ==
- Bærum, a municipality in Akershus County, Norway
