= May 20 =

May 20 this year in various calendars
- Wednesday, 20 May 2026
Akan	Kuruwukuo
Armenian	4 Margach 1475
Aztec	Ochpaniztli 10, 1 Tecpatl
Babylonian	2 Ayaru, 2337 SE
Balinese pawukon	Menga, Pasah, Laba, Paing, Paniron, Buda of Wariga, Brahma, Urungan, Manusa
Bengali	6 Joishtho, BS 1433
Chinese	Yang Wood Horse・Three Stars Mansion; Fire Horse Year, Month 4, Day 4 (Lixia, 1 day until Xiaoman)
Common Era	20 May 2026 CE
Coptic	12 Pashons, AM 1742
Egyptian	4 Phaophi, 2775 NE
Ethiopian	12 Genbot, 2018 Amätä Məhrät
French Republican	Décade I, Primidi de Prairial de l'Année 234 de la République
Gregorian	20 May, AD 2026
Hebrew	4 Sivan, AM 5786; Omer 48
Hindu	Ārdrā・Śūla; Solar: 6 Jyeṣṭha, 1948 SE; Lunisolar: Caturthī, Śukla pakṣa of Adhika Jyeṣṭha, 2083 VE; Rāudra・5127 KY・1,872,715
Icelandic	Miðvikudagur, 28 Harpa 2026
Islamic	3 Dhu al-Hijjah, AH 1447 (using tabular method)
ISO week date	2026-W21-3
Japanese	4 Uzuki, Reiwa 8 (Rikka, 1 day until Shōman)
Julian	7 May, AD 2026 (AM 7534)
Julian day	2461181
Korean	4 Baemdal, 4359 DE
Maya	13.0.13.10.18; 11 Zip, 1 Etznab
Roman	Nonis Maiis, MMDCCLXXIX AUC
Solar Hijri	30 Ordibehesht, SH 1405
Tibetan	4 sa ga, me pho rta 2153 or 1772 or 1000

<<	May					>>
Su	Mo	Tu	We	Th	Fr	Sa
					1	2
3	4	5	6	7	8	9
10	11	12	13	14	15	16
17	18	19	20	21	22	23
24	25	26	27	28	29	30
31
2026

May 20 in recent years
2026 (Wednesday)
2025 (Tuesday)
2024 (Monday)
2023 (Saturday)
2022 (Friday)
2021 (Thursday)
2020 (Wednesday)
2019 (Monday)
2018 (Sunday)
2017 (Saturday)

May 20 is the 140th day of the year (141st in leap years) in the Gregorian calendar; 225 days remain until the end of the year.

== Events ==
=== Pre-1600 ===
- 325 – The First Council of Nicaea is formally opened, starting the first ecumenical council of the Christian Church.
- 491 – Empress Ariadne marries Anastasius I. The widowed Augusta is able to choose her successor for the Byzantine throne, after Zeno (late emperor) dies of dysentery.
- 685 – The Battle of Dun Nechtain is fought between a Pictish army under King Bridei III and the invading Northumbrians under King Ecgfrith, who are decisively defeated.
- 794 – While visiting the royal Mercian court at Sutton Walls with a view to marrying princess Ælfthryth, King Æthelberht II of East Anglia is taken captive and beheaded.
- 921 – Christopher Lekapenos is crowned Byzantine co-emperor by his father, emperor Romanos I Lekapenos, on the feast of Whitsun.
- 942 – A Magyar raiding army defeats forces of the Muslim frontier state of Fraxinetum.
- 1202 – A major earthquake hits Syria, widely felt between Sicily and Iraq.
- 1217 – The Second Battle of Lincoln is fought near Lincoln, England, resulting in the defeat of Prince Louis of France by William Marshal, 1st Earl of Pembroke.
- 1293 – King Sancho IV of Castile creates the Estudio de Escuelas de Generales in Alcalá de Henares.
- 1426 – King Mohnyin Thado formally ascends to the throne of Ava.
- 1449 – The Battle of Alfarrobeira is fought, establishing the House of Braganza as a principal royal family of Portugal.
- 1497 – John Cabot sets sail from Bristol, England, on his ship Matthew looking for a route to the west (other documents give a May 2 date).
- 1498 – Portuguese explorer Vasco da Gama discovers the sea route to India when he arrives at Kozhikode (previously known as Calicut), India.
- 1520 – Hernan Cortés defeats Pánfilo de Narváez, sent by Spain to punish him for insubordination.
- 1521 – Ignatius of Loyola is seriously wounded in the Battle of Pampeluna.
- 1570 – Cartographer Abraham Ortelius issues Theatrum Orbis Terrarum, the first modern atlas.

=== 1601–1900 ===
- 1609 – Shakespeare's sonnets are first published in London, perhaps illicitly, by the publisher Thomas Thorpe.
- 1631 – The city of Magdeburg in Germany is seized by forces of the Holy Roman Empire and most of its inhabitants massacred, in one of the bloodiest incidents of the Thirty Years' War.
- 1645 – Yangzhou massacre: The ten day massacre of the residents of the city of Yangzhou, part of the Transition from Ming to Qing.
- 1714 – Johann Sebastian Bach leads the first performance of his cantata for Pentecost, Erschallet, ihr Lieder, BWV 172, at the chapel of Schloss Weimar.
- 1741 – The Battle of Cartagena de Indias ends in a Spanish victory and the British begin withdrawal towards Jamaica with substantial losses.
- 1775 – The Mecklenburg Declaration of Independence is allegedly signed in Charlotte, North Carolina.
- 1802 – By the Law of 20 May 1802, Napoleon Bonaparte reinstates slavery in the French colonies, revoking its abolition in the French Revolution.
- 1813 – Napoleon Bonaparte leads his French troops into the Battle of Bautzen in Saxony, Germany, against the combined armies of Russia and Prussia. The battle ends the next day with a French victory.
- 1861 – American Civil War: The state of Kentucky proclaims its neutrality, which will last until September 3 when Confederate forces enter the state.
- 1861 – American Civil War: The State of North Carolina secedes from the Union.
- 1862 – U.S. President Abraham Lincoln signs the Homestead Act into law, opening eighty-four million acres (340,000 km^{2}) of public land to settlers.
- 1864 – American Civil War: Battle of Ware Bottom Church: In the Virginia Bermuda Hundred campaign, 10,000 troops fight in this Confederate victory.
- 1873 – Levi Strauss and Jacob Davis receive a U.S. patent for blue jeans with copper rivets.
- 1875 – Signing of the Metre Convention by 17 nations leading to the establishment of the International System of Units.
- 1882 – The Triple Alliance between the German Empire, Austria-Hungary and the Kingdom of Italy is formed.
- 1883 – Krakatoa begins to erupt; the volcano explodes three months later, killing more than 36,000 people.
- 1891 – History of cinema: The first public display of Thomas Edison's prototype kinetoscope.

=== 1901–present ===
- 1902 – Cuba gains independence from the United States. Tomás Estrada Palma becomes the country's first President.
- 1927 – Treaty of Jeddah: The United Kingdom recognizes the sovereignty of King Ibn Saud in the Kingdoms of Hejaz and Nejd, which later merge to become the Kingdom of Saudi Arabia.
- 1927 – Charles Lindbergh takes off for Paris from Roosevelt Field in Long Island, N.Y., aboard the Spirit of St. Louis on the first nonstop solo flight across the Atlantic Ocean, landing 33 1/2 hours later.
- 1932 – Amelia Earhart takes off from Newfoundland to begin the world's first solo nonstop flight across the Atlantic Ocean by a female pilot, landing in Ireland the next day.
- 1932 – The American Friends of Lafayette is founded at Lafayette College in Easton, Pennsylvania
- 1940 – The Holocaust: The first prisoners arrive at a new concentration camp at Auschwitz.
- 1941 – World War II: Battle of Crete: German paratroops invade Crete.
- 1943 – The Luttra Woman, a bog body from the Early Neolithic period (radiocarbon-dated c. 3928–3651 BC), is discovered near Luttra, Sweden.
- 1948 – Generalissimo Chiang Kai-shek wins the 1948 Republic of China presidential election and is sworn in as the first President of the Republic of China at Nanjing.
- 1949 – In the United States, the Armed Forces Security Agency, the predecessor to the National Security Agency, is established.
- 1956 – In Operation Redwing, the first United States airborne hydrogen bomb is dropped over Bikini Atoll in the Pacific Ocean.
- 1958 – Capital Airlines Flight 300 collides in mid-air with a United States Air Force Lockheed T-33 over Brunswick, Maryland, killing 12.
- 1964 – Discovery of the cosmic microwave background radiation by Robert Woodrow Wilson and Arno Penzias.
- 1965 – One hundred twenty-one people are killed when Pakistan International Airlines Flight 705 crashes at Cairo International Airport.
- 1967 – The Popular Movement of the Revolution political party is established in the Democratic Republic of the Congo.
- 1969 – The Battle of Hamburger Hill in Vietnam ends.
- 1971 – In the Chuknagar massacre, Pakistani forces massacre thousands, mostly Bengali Hindus.
- 1980 – In a referendum in Quebec, the population rejects, with 60% of the vote, a government proposal to move towards independence from Canada.
- 1983 – First publications of the discovery of the HIV virus that causes AIDS in the journal Science by a team of French scientists including Françoise Barré-Sinoussi, Jean-Claude Chermann, and Luc Montagnier.
- 1983 – Church Street bombing: A car bomb planted by UMkhonto we Sizwe explodes on Church Street in South Africa's capital, Pretoria, killing 19 people and injuring 217 others.
- 1985 – Radio Martí, part of the Voice of America service, begins broadcasting to Cuba.
- 1989 – The Chinese authorities declare martial law in the face of pro-democracy demonstrations, setting the scene for the Tiananmen Square massacre.
- 1990 – The first post-Communist presidential and parliamentary elections are held in Romania.
- 1996 – Civil rights: The Supreme Court of the United States rules in Romer v. Evans against a law that would have prevented any city, town or county in the state of Colorado from taking any legislative, executive, or judicial action to protect the rights of gays and lesbians.
- 2002 – The independence of East Timor is recognized by Portugal, formally ending 23 years of Indonesian rule and three years of provisional UN administration (Portugal itself is the former colonizer of East Timor until 1976).
- 2009 – An Indonesian Air Force Lockheed L-100 Hercules crashes in Magetan Regency, killing 99.
- 2011 – Mamata Banerjee is sworn in as the Chief Minister of West Bengal, the first woman to hold this post.
- 2012 – At least 27 people are killed and 50 others injured when a 6.0-magnitude earthquake strikes northern Italy.
- 2013 – An EF5 tornado strikes the Oklahoma City suburb of Moore, killing 24 people and injuring 377 others.
- 2016 – The government of Singapore authorises the controversial execution of convicted murderer Kho Jabing for the murder of a Chinese construction worker despite international pleas for clemency, notably from Amnesty International and the United Nations.
- 2019 – The International System of Units (SI): The base units are redefined, making the international prototype of the kilogram obsolete.
- 2022 – Russo-Ukrainian war: Russia claims full control of the Ukrainian city of Mariupol after a nearly three-month siege.

== Births ==
=== Pre-1600 ===
- 1315 – Bonne of Luxembourg, first wife of John II of France (died 1349)
- 1470 – Pietro Bembo, Italian cardinal, poet, and scholar (died 1547)
- 1505 – Levinus Lemnius, Dutch writer (died 1568)
- 1531 – Thado Minsaw of Ava, Viceroy of Ava (died 1584)
- 1537 – Hieronymus Fabricius, Italian anatomist (died 1619)
- 1575 – Robert Heath, English judge and politician (died 1649)

=== 1601–1900 ===
- 1664 – Andreas Schlüter, German sculptor and architect (died 1714)
- 1726 – Francis Cotes, English painter and academic (died 1770)
- 1759 – William Thornton, Virgin Islander-American architect, designed the United States Capitol (died 1828)
- 1769 – Andreas Vokos Miaoulis, Greek admiral and politician (died 1835)
- 1772 – Sir William Congreve, 2nd Baronet, English inventor and politician, developed Congreve rockets (died 1828)
- 1776 – Simon Fraser, American-Canadian fur trader and explorer (died 1862)
- 1795 – Pedro María de Anaya, Mexican soldier. President (1847–1848) (died 1854)
- 1799 – Honoré de Balzac, French novelist and playwright (died 1850)
- 1806 – John Stuart Mill, English economist, civil servant, and philosopher (died 1873)
- 1811 – Alfred Domett, English-New Zealand poet and politician, 4th Prime Minister of New Zealand (died 1887)
- 1818 – William Fargo, American businessman and politician, co-founded Wells Fargo and American Express (died 1881)
- 1822 – Frédéric Passy, French economist and academic, Nobel Prize laureate (died 1912)
- 1824 – Cadmus M. Wilcox, Confederate States Army general (died 1890)
- 1825 – Antoinette Brown Blackwell, the first woman to be ordained as a mainstream Protestant minister in the U.S. (died 1921)
- 1830 – Hector Malot, French author (died 1907)
- 1838 – Jules Méline, French lawyer and politician, 65th Prime Minister of France (died 1925)
- 1851 – Emile Berliner, German-American inventor, invented the Gramophone record (died 1929)
- 1854 – George Prendergast, Australian politician, 28th Premier of Victoria (died 1937)
- 1856 – Henri-Edmond Cross, French Neo-Impressionist painter (died 1910)
- 1860 – Eduard Buchner, German chemist, zymologist, and academic, Nobel Prize laureate (died 1917)
- 1875 – Hendrik Offerhaus, Dutch Olympic rower and head of the Dutch Red Cross (died 1953)
- 1877 – Pat Leahy, Irish-American Olympic jumper (died 1927)
- 1879 – Hans Meerwein, German chemist (died 1965)
- 1882 – Sigrid Undset, Danish-Norwegian novelist, essayist, and translator, Nobel Prize laureate (died 1949)
- 1883 – Faisal I of Iraq (died 1933)
- 1886 – Ali Sami Yen, Turkish footballer and manager, founded the Galatasaray Sports Club (died 1951)
- 1894 – Chandrashekarendra Saraswati, Indian guru and scholar (died 1994)
- 1895 – R. J. Mitchell, English engineer, designed the Supermarine Spitfire and Supermarine S.6B (died 1937)
- 1897 – Diego Abad de Santillán, Spanish economist and author (died 1983)
- 1897 – Malcolm Nokes, English hammer and discus thrower (died 1986)
- 1898 – Eduard Ole, Estonian painter (died 1995)
- 1899 – Aleksandr Deyneka, Russian painter and sculptor (died 1969)
- 1899 – John Marshall Harlan II, American lawyer and jurist, Associate Justice of the US Supreme Court (died 1971)
- 1900 – Sumitranandan Pant, Indian poet and author (died 1977)

=== 1901–present ===
- 1901 – Max Euwe, Dutch chess player, mathematician, and author (died 1981)
- 1901 – Doris Fleeson, American journalist (died 1970)
- 1904 – Margery Allingham, English author of detective fiction (died 1966)
- 1906 – Giuseppe Siri, Italian cardinal (died 1989)
- 1907 – Carl Mydans, American photographer and journalist (died 2004)
- 1908 – Henry Bolte, Australian politician, 38th Premier of Victoria (died 1990)
- 1908 – Louis Daquin, French actor and director (died 1980)
- 1908 – Francis Raymond Fosberg, American botanist and author (died 1993)
- 1908 – James Stewart, American actor (died 1997)
- 1911 – Gardner Fox, American author (died 1986)
- 1911 – Annie M. G. Schmidt, Dutch author and playwright (died 1995)
- 1913 – Teodoro Fernández, Peruvian footballer (died 1996)
- 1913 – William Redington Hewlett, American engineer, co-founded Hewlett-Packard (died 2001)
- 1913 – Carlos J. Gradin, Argentine Archaeologist (died 2002)
- 1915 – Peter Copley, English actor (died 2008)
- 1915 – Moshe Dayan, Israeli general and politician, 5th Israeli Minister of Foreign Affairs (died 1981)
- 1915 – Joff Ellen, Australian comedian and actor (died 1999)
- 1916 – Owen Chadwick, English rugby player, historian, and academic (died 2015)
- 1916 – Alexey Maresyev, Russian soldier and pilot (died 2001)
- 1916 – Ondina Valla, Italian sprinter and hurdler (died 2006)
- 1917 – Tony Cliff, Israeli-English author and activist (died 2000)
- 1917 – Guy Favreau, Canadian lawyer, judge, and politician, 28th Canadian Minister of Justice (died 1967)
- 1918 – Alexandra Boyko, Russian tank commander (died 1996)
- 1918 – Edward B. Lewis, American biologist, geneticist, and academic, Nobel Prize laureate (died 2004)
- 1919 – George Gobel, American comedian (died 1991)
- 1920 – John Cruickshank, Scottish lieutenant and banker, Victoria Cross recipient (died 2025)
- 1921 – Wolfgang Borchert, German author and playwright (died 1947)
- 1921 – Hal Newhouser, American baseball player and scout (died 1998)
- 1921 – Hao Wang, Chinese-American logician, philosopher, and mathematician (died 1995)
- 1922 – Ted Hinton, Northern Irish international footballer (died 1988)
- 1923 – Edith Fellows, American actress (died 2011)
- 1923 – Sam Selvon, Trinidad-born writer (died 1994)
- 1924 – David Chavchavadze, English-American CIA officer and author (died 2014)
- 1924 – Zelmar Michelini, Uruguayan journalist and politician (died 1976)
- 1925 – Alexei Tupolev, Russian engineer, designed the Tupolev Tu-144 (died 2001)
- 1926 – Bob Sweikert, American race car driver (died 1956)
- 1927 – Bud Grant, American football player and coach (died 2023)
- 1927 – David Hedison, American actor (died 2019)
- 1927 – Franciszek Macharski, Polish cardinal (died 2016)
- 1929 – Pedro Trebbau, German-born Venezuelan zoologist (died 2021)
- 1929 – Gilles Loiselle, Canadian politician and diplomat, 33rd Canadian Minister of Finance (died 2022)
- 1930 – Sam Etcheverry, American football player and coach (died 2009)
- 1931 – Ken Boyer, American baseball player and manager (died 1982)
- 1931 – Louis Smith, American trumpeter (died 2016)
- 1932 – Dieter Rams, German industrial designer
- 1933 – Constance Towers, American actress and singer
- 1935 – José Mujica, Uruguayan guerrilla leader and politician, 40th President of Uruguay (died 2025)
- 1936 – Anthony Zerbe, American actor
- 1937 – Dave Hill, American golfer (died 2011)
- 1937 – Derek Lampe, English footballer
- 1939 – Balu Mahendra, Sri Lankan-Indian director, cinematographer, and screenwriter (died 2014)
- 1940 – Shorty Long, American singer-songwriter and producer (died 1969)
- 1940 – Stan Mikita, Slovak-Canadian ice hockey player and sportscaster (died 2018)
- 1940 – Sadaharu Oh, Japanese-Taiwanese baseball player and manager
- 1941 – Goh Chok Tong, Singaporean politician, 2nd Prime Minister of Singapore
- 1941 – John Strasberg, American actor and teacher
- 1942 – Raymond Chrétien, Canadian lawyer and diplomat, Canadian Ambassador to the United States
- 1942 – Lynn Davies, Welsh sprinter and long jumper
- 1942 – Carlos Hathcock, American sergeant and sniper (died 1999)
- 1942 – Frew McMillan, South African tennis player
- 1943 – Albano Carrisi, Italian singer, actor, and winemaker
- 1943 – Deryck Murray, Trinidadian cricketer
- 1944 – Joe Cocker, English singer-songwriter (died 2014)
- 1944 – Boudewijn de Groot, Indonesian-Dutch singer-songwriter and guitarist
- 1944 – Keith Fletcher, English cricketer and manager
- 1944 – Dietrich Mateschitz, Austrian businessman, co-founder of Red Bull GmbH (died 2022)
- 1944 – Pekka Siitoin, Finnish neo-Nazi and Satanist (d. 2003)
- 1945 – Vladimiro Montesinos, Peruvian intelligence officer
- 1946 – Cher, American singer-songwriter, producer, and actress
- 1946 – Bobby Murcer, American baseball player, coach, manager, and sportscaster (died 2008)
- 1947 – Steve Currie, English bass player (died 1981)
- 1947 – Greg Dyke, English journalist and academic
- 1949 – Robert Morin, Canadian director, cinematographer, and screenwriter
- 1949 – Michèle Roberts, English author and poet
- 1949 – Dave Thomas, Canadian actor, director, producer, and screenwriter
- 1950 – Andy Johns, English-American engineer and producer (died 2013)
- 1950 – Reinaldo Merlo, Argentinian footballer and coach
- 1950 – Jane Parker-Smith, English organist (died 2020)
- 1951 – Thomas Akers, American colonel, engineer, and astronaut
- 1951 – Christie Blatchford, Canadian newspaper columnist, journalist and broadcaster (died 2020)
- 1951 – Mike Crapo, American lawyer and politician
- 1952 – Roger Milla, Cameroonian footballer and manager
- 1952 – Michael Wills, English politician, British Minister of Justice
- 1953 – Robert Doyle, Australian educator and politician, 103rd Lord Mayor of Melbourne
- 1954 – David Paterson, American lawyer and politician, 55th Governor of New York
- 1954 – Colin Sutherland, Lord Carloway, Scottish lawyer and judge
- 1955 – Steve George, American keyboard player and songwriter
- 1955 – Zbigniew Preisner, Polish composer and producer
- 1956 – Ingvar Ambjørnsen, Norwegian-German author and critic (died 2025)
- 1956 – Gerry Peyton, English born Irish international footballer and coach
- 1956 – Douglas Preston, American journalist and author
- 1957 – Yoshihiko Noda, Japanese lawyer and politician, 62nd Prime Minister of Japan
- 1958 – Ron Reagan, American journalist and radio host
- 1958 – Jane Wiedlin, American singer-songwriter, guitarist, and actress
- 1959 – Susan Cowsill, American singer-songwriter
- 1960 – Tony Goldwyn, American actor and director
- 1961 – Clive Allen, English international footballer and manager
- 1961 – Nick Heyward, English singer-songwriter and guitarist
- 1963 – David Wells, American baseball player and sportscaster
- 1964 – Kōichirō Genba, Japanese politician, 80th Japanese Minister for Foreign Affairs
- 1964 – Edin Osmanović, Slovenian footballer, coach, and manager
- 1964 – Charles Spencer, 9th Earl Spencer, English journalist and author
- 1965 – Ted Allen, American television host and author
- 1965 – Stu Grimson, Canadian ice hockey player, sportscaster, and lawyer
- 1966 – Dan Abrams, American journalist and author
- 1967 – Graham Brady, English politician
- 1967 – Gabriele Muccino, Italian director, producer, and screenwriter
- 1968 – Timothy Olyphant, American actor and producer
- 1969 – Road Dogg, American wrestler, producer, and soldier
- 1970 – Terrell Brandon, American basketball player
- 1970 – Louis Theroux, Singaporean-English journalist and producer
- 1971 – Šárka Kašpárková, Czech triple jumper and coach
- 1971 – Hanne Stenvaag, Norwegian politician
- 1971 – Tony Stewart, American race car driver
- 1972 – Michael Diamond, Australian shooter
- 1972 – Christophe Dominici, French rugby player (died 2020)
- 1972 – Busta Rhymes, American rapper, producer, and actor
- 1973 – Nathan Long, Australian rugby league player
- 1974 – Allison Amend, American novelist and short story writer
- 1974 – Shiboprosad Mukherjee, Indian film director, writer and actor
- 1975 – Juan Minujín, Argentinian actor, director, and screenwriter
- 1976 – Ramón Hernández, Venezuelan-American baseball player
- 1976 – Tomoya Satozaki, Japanese baseball player
- 1977 – Matt Czuchry, American actor
- 1977 – Leo Franco, Argentinian footballer
- 1977 – Angela Goethals, American actress
- 1977 – Stirling Mortlock, Australian rugby player
- 1977 – Vesa Toskala, Finnish ice hockey player
- 1978 – Hristos Banikas, Greek chess player
- 1978 – Pavla Hamáčková-Rybová, Czech pole vaulter
- 1978 – Nils Schumann, German runner
- 1979 – Andrew Scheer, Canadian politician, 28th Leader of the Conservative Party of Canada
- 1979 – Jayson Werth, American baseball player
- 1980 – Austin Kearns, American baseball player
- 1980 – Kassim Osgood, American football player
- 1981 – Iker Casillas, Spanish footballer
- 1981 – Rachel Platten, American singer and songwriter
- 1981 – Lindsay Taylor, American basketball player
- 1981 – Mark Winterbottom, Australian race car driver
- 1982 – Petr Čech, Czech footballer
- 1982 – Imran Farhat, Pakistani cricketer
- 1982 – Jessica Raine, English actress
- 1982 – Daniel Ribeiro, Brazilian director, producer, and screenwriter
- 1983 – N. T. Rama Rao Jr., Indian Film Actor
- 1983 – Óscar Cardozo, Paraguayan footballer
- 1983 – Matt Langridge, English rower
- 1984 – Mauro Rafael da Silva, Brazilian footballer
- 1984 – Patrick Ewing Jr., American basketball player
- 1984 – Keith Grennan, American football player
- 1985 – Chris Froome, Kenyan-English cyclist
- 1985 – Brendon Goddard, Australian footballer
- 1986 – Dexter Blackstock, English footballer
- 1986 – Stéphane Mbia, Cameroonian footballer
- 1986 – Jiřina Svobodová, Czech pole vaulter
- 1987 – Mike Havenaar, Japanese footballer
- 1987 – Julian Wright, American basketball player
- 1988 – Joel Moon, Australian rugby league player
- 1989 – Siosia Vave, Australian-Tongan rugby league player
- 1990 – Josh O'Connor, British actor
- 1991 – Bastian Baker, Swiss singer, songwriter, and performer
- 1991 – Emre Çolak, Turkish footballer
- 1992 – Cate Campbell, Malawian-Australian swimmer
- 1992 – Jack Gleeson, Irish actor
- 1992 – Enes Kanter, Turkish basketball player
- 1992 – Fanny Smith, Swiss freestyle skier
- 1993 – Ramy Rabia, Egyptian footballer
- 1993 – Caroline Zhang, American figure skater
- 1996 – Brian Kelly, Australian rugby league player
- 1997 – Kaoru Mitoma, Japanese footballer
- 1998 – Jamie Chadwick, English race car driver
- 1998 – Nam Nguyen, Canadian figure skater
- 2012 – Doug the Pug, American celebrity dog

== Deaths ==
=== Pre-1600 ===
- 685 – Ecgfrith of Northumbria (born 645)
- 794 – Æthelberht II, king of East Anglia
- 965 – Gero the Great, Saxon ruler (born c. 900)
- 1062 – Bao Zheng, Chinese magistrate and mayor of Kaifeng (born 999)
- 1277 – Pope John XXI (born 1215)
- 1285 – John I of Cyprus (born 1259)
- 1291 – Sufi Saint Sayyid Jalaluddin Surkh-Posh Bukhari
- 1366 – Maria of Calabria, Empress of Constantinople (born 1329)
- 1444 – Bernardino of Siena, Italian-Spanish missionary and saint (born 1380)
- 1449 – Álvaro Vaz de Almada, 1st Count of Avranches
- 1449 – Infante Pedro, Duke of Coimbra (born 1392)
- 1476 – Isabel Ingoldisthorpe, English noblewoman (born 1441)
- 1501 – Columba of Rieti, Italian Dominican tertiary Religious Sister (born 1467)
- 1503 – Lorenzo di Pierfrancesco de' Medici, Italian banker and politician (born 1463)
- 1506 – Christopher Columbus, Italian explorer, early European explorer of the Americas (born 1451)
- 1550 – Ashikaga Yoshiharu, Japanese shōgun (born 1510)
- 1579 – Isabella Markham, English courtier (born 1527)

=== 1601–1900 ===
- 1622 – Osman II, Ottoman sultan (born 1604)
- 1645 – Shi Kefa, Chinese general and calligrapher (born 1601)
- 1648 – Władysław IV Vasa, Polish son of Sigismund III Vasa (born 1595)
- 1677 – George Digby, 2nd Earl of Bristol, Spanish-English politician, English Secretary of State (born 1612)
- 1713 – Thomas Sprat, English bishop (born 1635)
- 1717 – John Trevor, Welsh lawyer and politician, 102nd Speaker of the House of Commons (born 1637)
- 1722 – Sébastien Vaillant, French botanist and mycologist (born 1669)
- 1732 – Thomas Boston, Scottish author and educator (born 1676)
- 1782 – William Emerson, English mathematician and academic (born 1701)
- 1793 – Charles Bonnet, Swiss botanist and biologist (born 1720)
- 1812 – Count Hieronymus von Colloredo, Austrian archbishop (born 1732)
- 1834 – Gilbert du Motier, Marquis de Lafayette, French general (born 1757)
- 1841 – Joseph Blanco White, Spanish poet and theologian (born 1775)
- 1864 – John Clare, English poet (born 1793)
- 1873 – George-Étienne Cartier, Canadian soldier, lawyer, and politician, 9th Premier of East Canada (born 1814)
- 1880 – Ana Néri, Brazilian nurse and philanthropist (born 1814)
- 1896 – Clara Schumann, German pianist and composer (born 1819)

=== 1901–present ===
- 1909 – Ernest Hogan, American actor and composer (born 1859)
- 1917 – Valentine Fleming, Scottish soldier and politician (born 1887)
- 1917 – Philipp von Ferrary, Italian stamp collector (born 1850)
- 1924 – Bogd Khan, Mongolian ruler (c. 1869)
- 1925 – Joseph Howard, Maltese politician, 1st Prime Minister of Malta (born 1862)
- 1931 – Ernest Noel, Scottish businessman and politician (born 1831)
- 1940 – Verner von Heidenstam, Swedish author and poet, Nobel Prize laureate (born 1859)
- 1942 – Hector Guimard, French Architect (born 1867)
- 1946 – Jacob Ellehammer, Danish pilot and engineer (born 1871)
- 1947 – Philipp Lenard, Slovak-German physicist and academic, Nobel Prize laureate (born 1862)
- 1947 – Georgios Siantos, Greek sergeant and politician (born 1890)
- 1949 – Damaskinos of Athens, Greek archbishop and politician, 137th Prime Minister of Greece (born 1891)
- 1956 – Max Beerbohm, English essayist, parodist, and caricaturist (born 1872)
- 1956 – Zoltán Halmay, Hungarian swimmer and trainer (born 1881)
- 1961 – Josef Priller, German colonel and pilot (born 1915)
- 1962 – Timothy (Szretter), a Polish Orthodox clergyman, the third Metropolitan of Warsaw and all Poland (born 1901)
- 1964 – Rudy Lewis, American singer (born 1936)
- 1971 – Waldo Williams, Welsh poet and academic (born 1904)
- 1973 – Renzo Pasolini, Italian motorcycle racer (born 1938)
- 1973 – Jarno Saarinen, Finnish motorcycle racer (born 1945)
- 1975 – Barbara Hepworth, English sculptor and lithographer (born 1903)
- 1976 – Syd Howe, Canadian ice hockey player (born 1911)
- 1976 – Zelmar Michelini, Uruguayan journalist and politician (born 1924)
- 1976 – Héctor Gutiérrez Ruiz, Uruguayan politician (born 1934)
- 1989 – John Hicks, English economist and academic, Nobel Prize laureate (born 1904)
- 1989 – Gilda Radner, American actress and comedian (born 1946)
- 1995 – Les Cowie, Australian rugby league player (born 1925)
- 1996 – Jon Pertwee, English actor, portrayed the Third Doctor (born 1919)
- 1998 – Robert Normann, Norwegian guitarist (born 1916)
- 2000 – Jean-Pierre Rampal, French flute player (born 1922)
- 2000 – Malik Sealy, American basketball player and actor (born 1970)
- 2000 – Yevgeny Khrunov, Russian colonel, engineer, and astronaut (born 1933)
- 2001 – Renato Carosone, Italian singer-songwriter and pianist (born 1920)
- 2002 – Stephen Jay Gould, American paleontologist, biologist, and academic (born 1941)
- 2005 – Paul Ricœur, French philosopher and academic (born 1913)
- 2005 – William Seawell, American general (born 1918)
- 2007 – Norman Von Nida, Australian golfer (born 1914)
- 2008 – Hamilton Jordan, American politician, 8th White House Chief of Staff (born 1944)
- 2009 – Arthur Erickson, Canadian architect and urban planner, designed Roy Thomson Hall (born 1924)
- 2009 – Lucy Gordon, American actress and model (born 1980)
- 2009 – Pierre Gamarra, French author, poet, and critic (born 1919)
- 2011 – Randy Savage, American wrestler and actor (born 1952)
- 2012 – Leela Dube, Indian anthropologist and scholar (born 1923)
- 2012 – Robin Gibb, Manx-English singer-songwriter and producer (born 1949)
- 2012 – David Littman, English-Swiss historian, author, and academic (born 1933)
- 2012 – Ken Lyons, American bass guitarist (born 1953)
- 2012 – Eugene Polley, American engineer, invented the remote control (born 1915)
- 2012 – Andrew B. Steinberg, American lawyer (born 1958)
- 2013 – Flavio Costantini, Italian painter and illustrator (born 1926)
- 2013 – Billie Dawe, Canadian ice hockey player and manager (born 1924)
- 2013 – Anders Eliasson, Swedish composer (born 1947)
- 2013 – Miloslav Kříž, Czech basketball player and coach (born 1924)
- 2013 – Ray Manzarek, American singer-songwriter, keyboard player, and producer (born 1939)
- 2013 – Denys Roberts, English judge and politician (born 1923)
- 2013 – Zach Sobiech, American singer-songwriter (born 1995)
- 2014 – Sandra Bem, American psychologist and academic (born 1944)
- 2014 – Ross Brown, New Zealand rugby player (born 1934)
- 2014 – Robyn Denny, English-French painter (born 1930)
- 2014 – Arthur Gelb, American journalist, author, and critic (born 1924)
- 2014 – Prince Rupert Loewenstein, Spanish-English businessman (born 1933)
- 2014 – Barbara Murray, English actress (born 1929)
- 2015 – Bob Belden, American saxophonist, composer, and producer (born 1956)
- 2015 – Femi Robinson, Nigerian actor and playwright (born 1940)
- 2016 – Kho Jabing, Malaysian convicted murderer who was executed by hanging in Singapore (born 1984)
- 2019 – Niki Lauda, Austrian race car driver (born 1949)
- 2021 – Gary Wilson, American anti-pornography activist (born 1956)
- 2022 – Roger Angell, American sportswriter and author (born 1920)
- 2022 – Susan Roces, Filipino actress (born 1941)
- 2024 – Ivan Boesky, American stock trader (born 1937)
- 2025 – George Wendt, American actor and comedian (born 1948)

== Holidays and observances ==
- Christian feast day:
  - Abercius and Helena
  - Alcuin of York
  - Aurea of Ostia
  - Austregisilus
  - Baudilus
  - Bernardino of Siena
  - Columba of Rieti
  - Lydia of Thyatira
  - Lucifer of Cagliari
  - Sanctan
  - May 20 (Eastern Orthodox liturgics)
- Day of Remembrance (Cambodia)
- Emancipation Day (Florida)
- European Maritime Day (European Council)
- Independence Restoration Day, celebrates the independence of East Timor from Indonesia in 2002.
- Josephine Baker Day (NAACP)
- National Awakening Day (Indonesia), and its related observances:
  - Indonesian Doctor Day (Indonesia)
- National Day (Cameroon)
- World Bee Day
- World Metrology Day
- Doug the Pug Day (Nashville, Tennessee)

== Bibliography ==
- Aung-Thwin, Michael A. (2017). Myanmar in the Fifteenth Century. Honolulu: University of Hawai'i Press. ISBN 978-0-8248-6783-6.
- Kala, U (2006) [1724]. Maha Yazawin (in Burmese). Vol. 1–3 (4th printing ed.). Yangon: Ya-Pyei Publishing.
