= Axel Bagge =

Swedish archaeologist

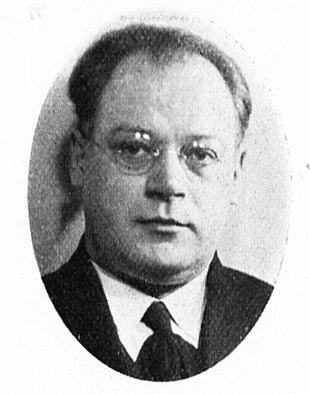
Axel Bagge

Axel Ivar Bagge (22 February 1894 – 12 February 1953) was a Swedish archaeologist, who made numerous contributions to the research of the Stone Age remains in Scandinavia.

Bagge was born in Rimbo, Sweden, as the son of syssloman (Note: In Swedish and Finnish law, syssloman is a person entrusted with the management of a principal's financial or legal affairs.) Ivar Bagge and Hilma, née Mattson. After initially studying experimental psychology under psychologist Sidney Alrutz at Uppsala University, Bagge switched his major to archaeology. He was hired by the Swedish History Museum in 1925, where he became second antiquarian in 1936 and first antiquarian in 1946.

In the early 1930s, he investigated the Mesolithic remains in Blekinge, a Swedish province in the southern coast of Götaland, exhaustively with another archaeologist Knut Kjellmark. After the Neolithic bog body known as the Luttra Woman was found in Falbygden near Luttra in 1943, Bagge was the first to report the discovery in 1947, in the academic journal Fornvännen.

Bagge was the director of the Swedish History Museum's Stone and Bronze Age department until his death in 1953.
