= My Cloud Grocer =

- Industry: Grocery eCommerce
- Founded: 2012; 14 years ago
- Headquarters: Brooklyn, New York, United States
- Key people: Yehuda Vernik (CTO); Dan Dashevsky (COO)
- Website: mycloudgrocer.com

My Cloud Grocer (or "MCG") is a grocery eCommerce software platform for supermarket chains. It was founded by Yehuda Vernik and Dan Dashevsky in 2012.

== History ==
Vernik and Dashevsky created an online platform to enables larger single stores and supermarket chains to offer all of their products via a virtual storefront. The platform is designed for supermarkets to integrate their brick and mortar stores into an online environment. MCGs main offices are based in Brooklyn, New York, where they launched their first client in 2013.

In 2012, MCG created white label grocery eCommerce websites for stores such as Breadberry, Grand & Essex market, Rockland Supermarket, Western Kosher, Seasons, The Market Place and SuperStop, and others.

In July 2019, MCG partnered with Truno to provide brick-and-mortar grocers the opportunity to compete in the online grocery space.

== See also ==
- Online grocer
