= Metallurgy in Azerbaijan =

The metallurgical production of the Republic of Azerbaijan is considered high due to the large deposits of alunite, polymetallic ores, deposits of iron ore, etc. The metallurgy industry of Azerbaijan encompasses both ferrous and non-ferrous branches.

== Ferrous metallurgy ==
Ferrous metallurgy includes extraction of iron, smelting and refining of iron ore, rolling and ferroalloys production. The ferrous metallurgy production of the country started to meet the demand of oil and gas industry (due to pipe production) and grew further in order to improve other branches of the industry. Dashkasan iron ore in 4 deposits (Dashkesen, South Dashkasan, Hamanchay, Demiroglu) in the valley of Goshagarchay plays a key role in the development of ferrous metallurgy. The cities of Baku, Sumgait and Dashkesan are major centers of metallurgy in terms of extraction and processing of iron ore. The Sumgait Pipe-Rolling Plant produces drill pipes, casing, tubing, oil and gas pipes, etc. Bentonite clay deposits in the village of Dash Salakhly, Gazakh district, is used in steel smelting. Baku Steel Company, the largest metallurgical enterprise in Azerbaijan, was opened in 2001 on the initiative of Heydar Aliyev. With two electric arc furnaces and three rolling lines, the annual steel production capacity of the company increased to 1,000,000 tons.

== Non-ferrous metallurgy ==
Aluminum, copper, molybdenum, cobalt, mercury reserves and most importantly electricity for the smelting process has led to the development of non-ferrous metallurgy. The Zeylik mine in Daskasan district is the main provider of the alunite for aluminum production. The extracted ore here transported through Guschu-Alabashli railway to the aluminum plant located in Ganja city. The obtained aluminum oxide is brought to Sumgayit aluminum plant in order to produce aluminum. Ganja Aluminum Plant produces sulfuric acid, aluminum oxide, and potassium fertilizer through extracted ore from Zalik deposit in Dashkesen. Aluminum oxide is also produced in Sumgait. AzerGold CJSC (created by the Presidential Decree No. 1047 on February 11, 2015) implements exploration, management, and also extraction, processing and sale of precious and non-ferrous metal ore deposits located within the borders of the country. In 2017, the volume of exports of precious metals carried out by this company amounted to 77340 million dollars.

== Gold mining ==
Gold mining began in Gedebey in 2009. In 2016, Azer Gold CJSC began gold mining in the Chovdar deposit. In 2017, 6,390.8 kg of gold was mined (which exceeded the 2016 production by 3.4 times. Gold production in January–May 2018 amounted to 2,081.7 kg, which exceeds last year's data by 19.5%. In the first quarter of 2018, the company's exports amounted to $30 million. In 2017, 59,617 ounces of gold produces by Anglo Asian Mining PLC (the main gold producer in Azerbaijan) from Gadir Ugur and Gosha deposits.

== Large metallurgical enterprises ==
- Sumgait Aluminum Plant
- Ganja Aluminum Plant
- Bakı Poladtökmə
- Bakusteelcompany
- Sumgait Pipe Plant
- AzerGold
- CJSC Global Construction
- CJSC Atahan Dirmir Sənaye
- Daşkəsən Filizsaflaşdırma
- Azərboru
- Azərqızıl
- Azertexnolayn LLC

 https://www.azertexnolayn.com/en/

== See also ==
- Natural Resources of Azerbaijan
- Environment of Azerbaijan
