= Carl-Herman Hjortsjö =

Swedish physician (1914–1978)

Carl-Herman Hjortsjö (8 December 1914 – 3 July 1978), born Carl-Herman Hirschlaff, was a Swedish anatomist, physician, and physical anthropologist. His contributions to historical osteology were instrumental in establishing it as an academic field in Sweden.

Hjortsjö was born in Malmö, Sweden, to Herold Hirschlaff, a practicing physician, and Ester Hirschlaff (née Sandstedt). He obtained his medical license in Lund, Sweden, in 1942. During his studies at Lund University's Department of Anatomy, Hjortsjö was taught by Gaston Backman and Carl Magnus Fürst, two of Sweden's pioneering anatomists at the time. In 1945, Hjortsjö earned his Doctor of Medicine degree with a dissertation on the morphogenesis of epithelial pulmonary primordium—the development of the early lung tissue—in cats.

In 1948, Hjortsjö made significant contributions to the study of human liver anatomy, becoming the first to demonstrate its segmental division. His findings later proved essential for advancements in liver surgery and transplantation techniques. Hjortsjö collaborated with archaeologist Karl Esaias Sahlström and osteologist Nils-Gustaf Gejvall on a physical anthropological investigation of the Luttra Woman, a Neolithic bog body discovered in 1943. Their findings, including a detailed description of the remains, were published in 1952.

In 1969, Hjortsjö developed the first system to taxonomize human facial movements based on their appearances. This system included descriptions of the changes in appearance caused by the action of each facial muscle. American psychologists Paul Ekman and Wallace Friesen later formalized these descriptions in 1978 as the Facial Action Coding System.
