= Georges Panayotis =

French-Greek businessman

- Born: 09/02/1955; Heraklion, Crete, Greece
- Other name: Georges Chatzipanayotis
- Occupations: Founder, Chairman & CEO of MKG Group and Hospitality ON
- Known for: Tourism, Hospitality & Hotel Industry
- Children: Vanguelis, Alexis, Emno

Georges Panayotis (Georges Panayotis is a pseudonym for Georges Chatzipanayotis) is a French/Greek businessman and consultant for the tourism, hotel and hospitality industries. He has contributed to establishing more than 2,500 hotels (150,000 hotel rooms) in France and throughout EMEA, representing a global investment of over 10.5 billion euros.

== Early life ==
Panayotis was born into a family of hoteliers, and left Greece at the age of 18 to study political science. After gaining a management degree at the Paris Dauphine University he began working at Novotel, now part of the Accor Group, eventually becoming International Marketing Director. Having developed specialised marketing and management tools for the hotel industry, he left the group in 1985 to establish MKG Group.

== Business career ==
Over the past 30 years, Panayotis has led MKG Conseil, now known as the MKG Group. In 2008 the company had over 110 employees across Europe, the Middle East and Africa, and specialised in four core activities: market surveys, quality control, database management, and industry press. In 2006, the company’s turnover was 12 million euro and was ranked 1st in France, specialising in marketing and the tourism industry, and ranked 20th in the national classification of the top 100 market research institutes by Marketing Magazine.

MKG Group, specialised in the tourism industry, is currently the leader in marketing studies for the worldwide hotel and tourism market.

== Public career ==
Panayotis helped launch industry publications Hospitality ON Magazine & hospitality-on.com (previously HTR Magazine and Hôtel Restau), and created three major annual events: Worldwide Hospitality Awards, the Global Lodging Forum and the Tourinvest Forum. His published work include Constat et Plan Marketing (Marketing Status and Planning), Marketing Opérationnel des Services (Operational Marketing of Services), and L'hôtellerie française et son évolution (The Hotel Industry in France and its evolution). He holds two Official National Distinctions Medals: Chevalier dans l’Ordre de la Légion d’Honneur (2001) and Chevalier dans l’Ordre National du Mérite.

He is also a professor at the Accor Academy in Évry, Essonne, Île-de-France and Lecturer at University of Marne la Vallée, Île-de-France, social sciences, tourism and leisure, and a consultant for several radio (France Inter, RMC) and television stations focusing on the economy, travel and hospitality industry ( BFM, France 24, . He sits on the advisory panel for the Minister of the Economy, Industry and Employment (France) &. In 1988 he was a candidate in the 13ème circonscription for the 15th arrondissement of Paris (Saint-Lambert, Javel) elections.

When he was working at Accor in 2001, he arranged a preferential rate at the Sofitel in Venice for François Hollande's former political advisor. In return, he received the Legion of Honor.
