= Virtual store research =

Method of marketing research

Virtual store research is an extension of the traditional methods of marketing research. While marketing research employs techniques like focus groups, surveys and observation to better understand consumer decision-making, virtual store research uses these standard research techniques within a simulated store setting, delivered via computer. Virtual store research uses 2-dimensional and 3-dimensional computer simulation technology to create retail contexts that are as close to the real shopping experience as possible. This allows test consumers within the virtual environment to interact with store merchandise and make purchase decisions in a way that closely resembles real in-store behavior.

Additionally, virtual store technology can help consumer packaged goods companies and retailers make daily business decisions without the need for physically changing stores and products.

== History ==
Prior to the emergence of virtual store technology, the only way to get in-store behavioral data was through in-person store research. In-person store research is the acknowledged gold standard for testing the impact of changes in price, planograms, product packaging, or new products on consumer behavior. A controlled store test requires a change to be made in one set of stores but not in another similar set of stores. The sales results are then compared to determine if the change was beneficial. This approach is often paired with intercept research, which requires the researcher to station data collectors in actual stores and interrupt shoppers to ask questions about their shopping experience. These types of tests take place at the time of purchase and are widely considered to yield the most accurate insights about actual consumer behavior. However, they are very expensive and time consuming, and the tests themselves are considered by many shoppers and storeowners to be highly intrusive.

Virtual store research emerged as a more cost-effective alternative that could address the drawbacks of in-person store research through controlled simulations.

Methodologies for simulating a shelf set in a virtual environment first emerged in the 1990s, led by academic research labs like Harvard Business School’s Marketing Simulation Lab. In 1996, Harvard Business Review published a seminal article by Professor Raymond R. Burke called “Virtual Shopping: Breakthrough in Marketing Research,” which established empirically that “laboratory data can accurately predict the brand market share and consumer price sensitivity observed in the supermarket. Those predictions were most accurate when the simulation reproduced the visual cues that consumers used to make their purchase decisions.” His data indicated that virtual store sales correlate closely with sales in actual stores (correlation scores ranged from 0.90 for beauty categories to 0.94 for cleaning products in one test).

However, Burke was a decade early with his article. In a 2008 survey of researchers, only 3.7% of respondents reported using virtual testing techniques. The reason for the slow initial adoption of virtual store research is that these tests were still performed in remote labs, requiring consumers to come to specific locations. Early adopter Kimberly-Clark was featured on the front page of The Wall Street Journal in 2007 for its use of virtual store technology in marketing research, but mainstream market penetration remained low.

For vendors virtual store technologies tend to fall into one of two categories:

- Early market entrants took a realistic 3D shelf set out of the lab and allowed consumer testing in the field using a laptop running the technology. Respondents were recruited ad hoc at grocery stores to participate in tests.
- Others saw the Internet as a way to draw on larger samples more quickly and cost-effectively ad optimized 2D, rather than 3D, product images in a lightweight store simulation so that surveys could be executed efficiently through web browsers using the dial-up Internet connections still prevalent in the early 2000s.

The long-term promise of virtual store research remains as articulated by Burke in 1996: “One day, the virtual store may become a channel for direct, personal, and intelligent communications with the consumer, one that encompasses research, sales and service.”

== Usage ==
Marketing research

Virtual store technology is generally used to answer questions regarding customer decisions within an in-store setting. This includes all of the following:

- New product placement
- Packaging changes
- Pricing studies
- In-store marketing levers, including displays, promotions and messaging
- Merchandising strategies
- Planogram or shelf-set changes
- In-store events
- Product or category findability studies

Integration with point of sale data

In 2011, InContext Solutions introduced Visualize InContext, a software tool that allows companies to view actual point-of-sales data within the virtual store environment. Through Visualize InContext, marketers and retailers can see in real time what is happening on the shelf, enabling them to tune their shelf restocking schedules and better optimize planograms for the most efficient product sell–through using actual point-of-sale data.

Fusion with Online Shopping In 2017, Buzz 3D introduced their Buzz 3D Retail Suite, which as well as providing 3D Planogram creation, Store Planning and Virtual Store Research functions, leveraged 3D Cloud functionality to permit live access to the Virtual Store from any video-capable device. By defining products within the store individually, and making it simple and cost-effective to create from photography, retailers now have a means of selling through a Virtual Store in addition to just conducting research studies alone.

Additional applications

Virtual store technologies have additional applications as visualization tools for internal marketing and product development efforts, including the following:

- Collaboration between manufacturers and suppliers for package design and product development
- Collaboration between manufacturers and retail partners
- Visualization of in-store marketing and promotional ideas within marketing departments
- Virtual store displays to showcase products at trade shows or with outside partners
- As a visualization aid for professional sales forces

== See also ==
- A/B testing
- List of marketing research firms
- Market analysis
- Market research
- Marketing
- Marketing Research Association
- Marketing research
- Neuromarketing
- Quantitative marketing research
