= Çovdar, Dashkasan =

Çovdar
- Municipality
- Location within Azerbaijan
- Coordinates: 40°37′13″N 46°05′59″E
- Country: Azerbaijan
- Rayon: Dashkasan

Population
  - Total: 65
- Time zone: UTC+4 (AZT)
  - Summer (DST): UTC+5 (AZT)

Çovdar (also, Chovdar, earlier Hartshangist (from Armenian: Հարցհանգիստ, romanized: Harc’hangist, lit. 'resting place of fathers')) is a village and municipality in the Dashkasan Rayon of Azerbaijan. It is located on the northern slop of the Chovdar mountain.

It has a population of 65. The municipality consists of the villages of Çovdar and Çaykənd.

== Archaeology ==
Archaeological excavations were carried out in the Chovdar region between 2019 and 2021 by archaeologists from the Institute of Archaeology and Anthropology of ANAS in the gold ore processing area of "AzerGold" CJSC. That same year, archaeologists unearthed 156 stone box graves. These graves were constructed using megalithic materials—large rocks and stones. Some of the stones had been shaped or hewn, while others remained unworked. Smaller stones were placed between the larger ones to fill in the gaps.

More than 200 stone box graves dating to the Khojali-Gadabay culture of the Late Bronze–Early Iron Age in Azerbaijan were uncovered during the rescue excavations. Archaeologists identified a burial custom in which males were buried on their right side and females on their left. Some individuals showed signs of physical illnesses, including dental pathologies, and a trepanned skull was also discovered. Weapons, head ornaments, ceramic products, and a horse burial were among the notable finds.

In March 2026, the book “Çovdar nekropolu”, detailing the results of archaeological investigations at the Chovdar necropolis was officially presented to the public at the Stone Chronicle Museum. The publication summarizes several years of research conducted since 2019. Scientific analyses, including ancient DNA studies, revealed demographic patterns, kinship relations, and causes of death, indicating that the buried population was of local Caucasian origin and inhabited the region for over 400 years. The findings also provide evidence of early metallurgy and long-distance cultural connections, contributing significantly to the study of prehistoric societies in Azerbaijan.
