= Carl Magnus Fürst =

Swedish anthropologist, racial theorist, and anatomist (1854–1935)

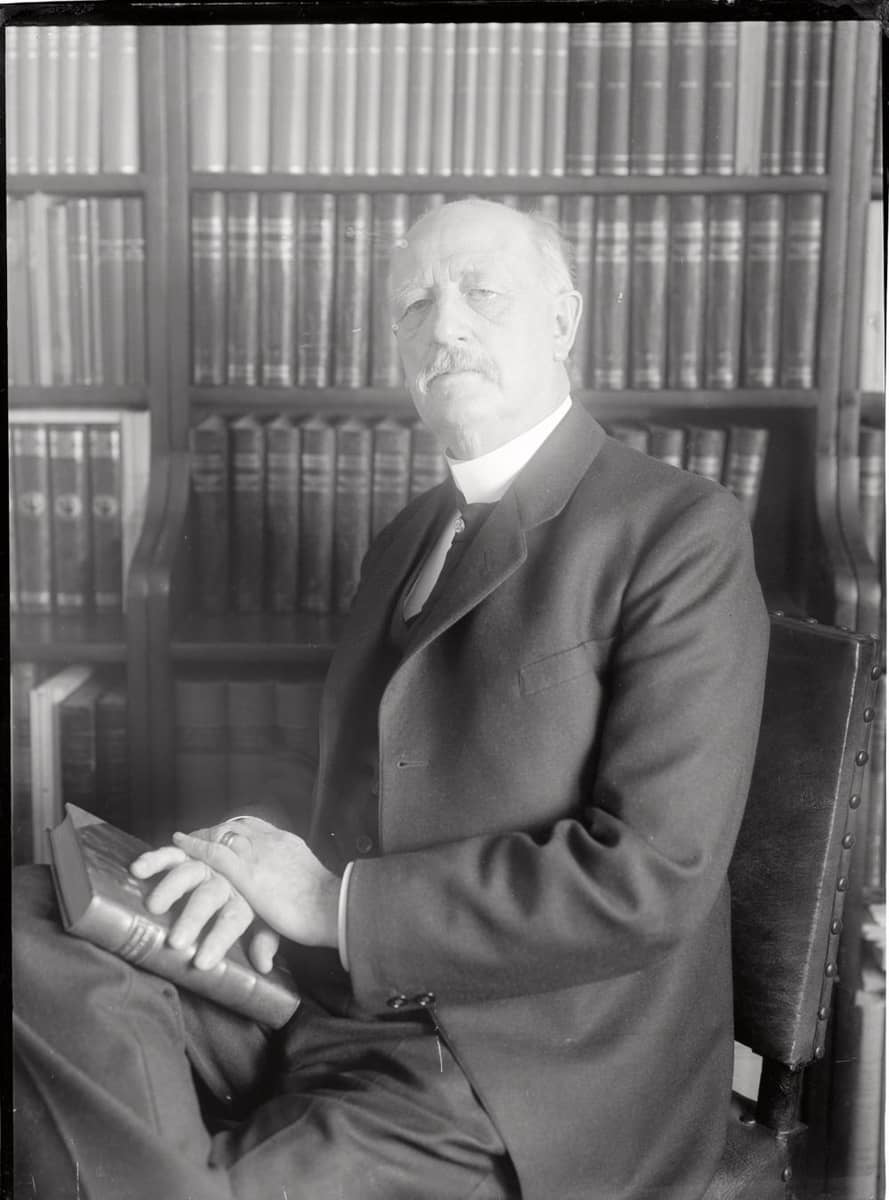
In 1929

Carl Magnus Fürst (24 December 1854 – 12 April 1935) was a Swedish physician and professor of anatomy at the University of Lund. He contributed to physical anthropology and studied the skeletal characters and craniology from archaeological studies apart from an interest in the history of medicine in Sweden.

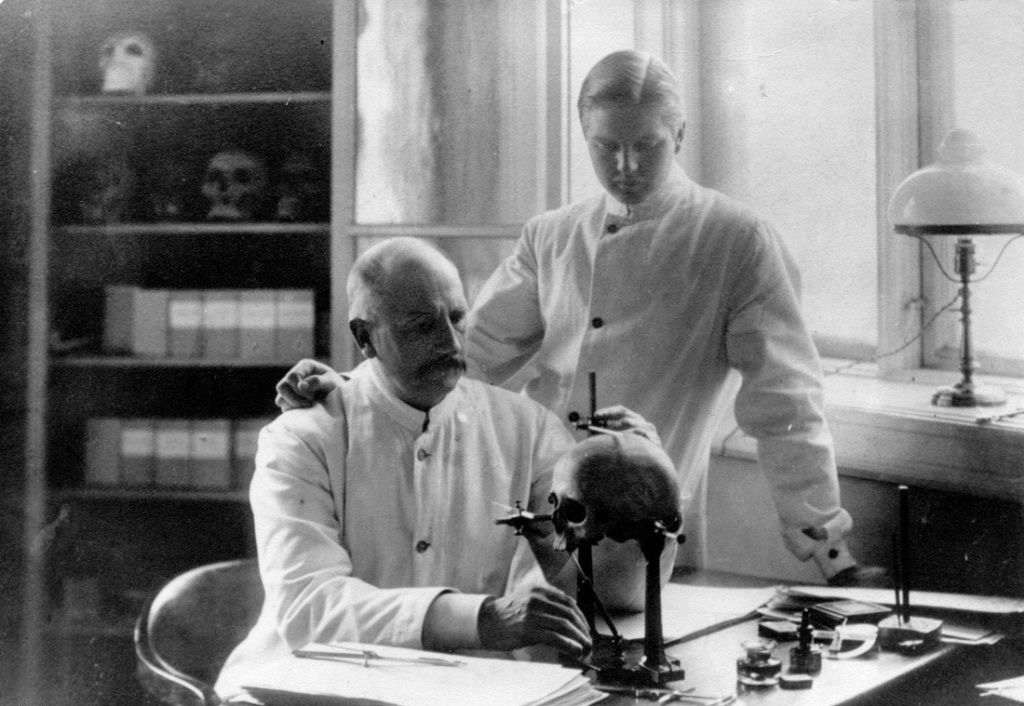
With son Carl Andreas

Fürst was born in Karlskrona to army physician Carl Absalon and Betty Wilhelmina Hubendick. He studied at Karlskrona before going to study at Uppsala University in 1874 and then at the Karolinska Institute in Stockholm. He obtained a medical license from Lund in 1885 and a doctorate in 1887. His doctoral thesis was on seminal corpuscles. He became a prosector in anatomy in 1885 and in 1888 he became a professor of anatomy and histology. He took an interest in the history of medicine and anthropology and in 1902 he published Anthropologia suecica along with his teacher Gustaf Retzius. It was based on the measurements made of 45000 Swedish conscripts. In 1912 he published “Zur Kraniologie der schwedischen Steinzeit” (1912), a study of stone age skeletons in Sweden. He examined cranial trephination and evidence of cannibalism in Stone Age skeletons. In his studies on medical history he published Anders Retzius's letter to Arvid Henrik Florman (1896) and on the correspondence of Kilian Stobæus the Elder. Fürst and Retzius were involved in the Swedish eugenic movement. In 1920 he supported the move to establish an institution on Race Biology in an opinion to prime minister Hjalmar Branting.

Fürst married Hanna Olga Haanshus (1863–1938) in 1885 and they had a son Carl Andreas, who became a doctor, and daughter.
