= Luttra Woman =

Neolithic bog body from Sweden

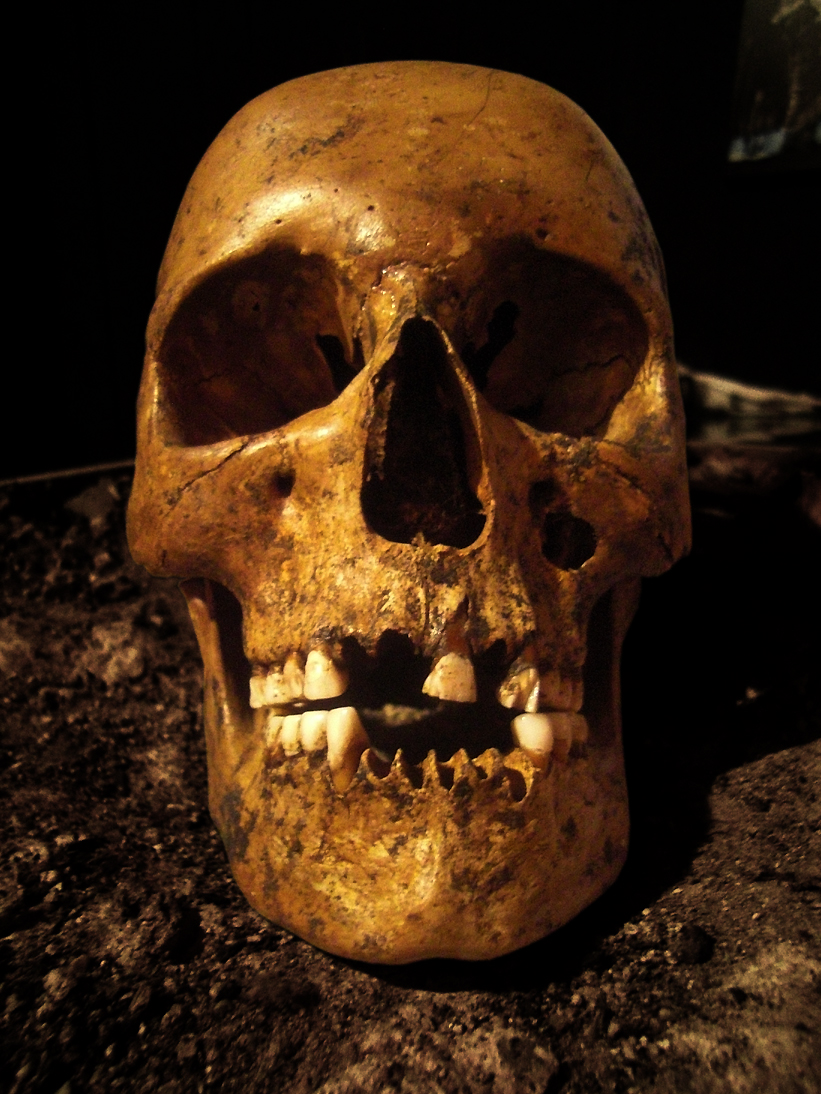
- The skull of the Luttra Woman with a perforation below the left eye socket, likely from chronic infection
- Died: 3928–3651 BC; Present-day Mönarpa mossar near Luttra, Sweden
- Body discovered: 20 May 1943; 58°06′48″N 13°31′14″E
- Resting place: Falbygden Museum, Falköping, Sweden
- Other name: Hallonflickan (lit. 'Raspberry Girl')
- Era: Early Neolithic

The Luttra Woman is a skeletonised bog body (Note: The term bog body encompasses human remains with soft tissue and/or hair preserved in a bog, and skeletal remains "which can reasonably be assumed to have been deposited [in a bog] as a complete body".) discovered in a peat bog in Falbygden near Luttra, Sweden. The remains were found on 20 May 1943 by a peat cutter. The skull was well-preserved, but some bones of the skeleton, particularly many between the skull and the pelvis, were missing. Osteological assessment identified the remains as those of a young female. The presence of raspberry seeds in her stomach contents, together with an estimated age of early to mid-twenties at death, led to her being nicknamed Hallonflickan (Swedish: [ˈhalɔnˌflɪkːan]; lit. 'Raspberry Girl'). Radiocarbon-dated to 3928–3651 BC, she was, as of 2015, the earliest known Neolithic individual from Western Sweden. In a study, her estimated height of 145 cm (4 ft 9 in) was deemed short for a Stone Age woman of the region.

Several anthropological studies have reported no evidence of injuries or fatal diseases on her remains. Researchers concluded that she had likely been bound and placed in shallow water at or shortly after her death. Axel Bagge, an archaeologist who took part in the initial examination, proposed that her death may have resulted from deliberate drowning, either as a human sacrifice or as the consequence of a witch execution. An alternative interpretation suggested that the bindings were part of a water burial ritual performed after her death from unrelated causes. Since 1994, her skeleton has been part of the permanent exhibition Forntid på Falbygden ('Prehistory in Falbygden') at the Falbygden Museum in Falköping, Sweden. In June 2011, the museum added a forensic bust reconstruction to the display.

== Discovery ==
The discovery site shown within Sweden

On 20 May 1943, whilst cutting peat in Rogestorp—a raised bog within the Mönarpa mossar bog complex in Falbygden near Luttra—Carl Wilhelmsson, a resident of the neighbouring Kinneved parish, discovered one of the skeleton's hands at a depth of 1.2 m (4 ft) below the surface. Upon being notified, police investigators determined that the depth of the remains indicated antiquity, ruling out the possibility of a prosecutable crime. Falbygden, a rural area in southwestern Sweden known for its agricultural economy, was an archaeological site for prehistoric human and animal remains. Between the 1920s and 1950s, local antiquarians documented many such finds, often uncovered during the expansion of peat extraction in the area. Many of these remains in Falbygden were relatively well-preserved, aided by the region's carbonate-rich bedrock, which enhanced the natural preservation process.

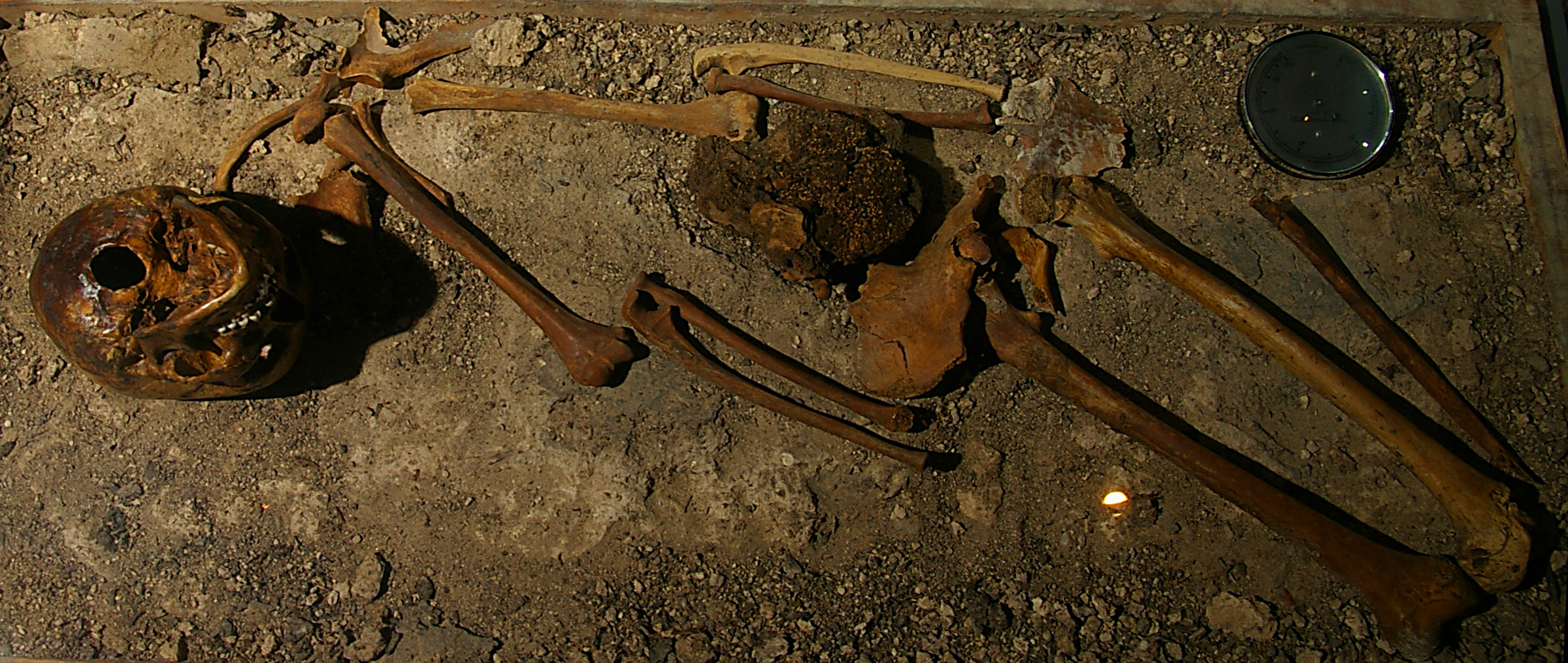
The Luttra Woman in the posture in which she was found, with her legs drawn tightly into a squatting position

Wilhelmsson informed the local representative of the Swedish National Heritage Board, teacher and archaeologist Hilding Svensson. Svensson inspected the find the following day and forwarded a discovery report to the Board, requesting expert assistance. The Board dispatched geologist and archaeologist Karl Esaias Sahlström, along with palynologist Carl Larsson, both from the Geological Survey of Sweden.

They observed that the skeleton was in an upright position, with the detached skull rolled in such a manner that the chin and foramen magnum were oriented directly upwards. A segment of the skeleton had been inadvertently cut through during Wilhelmsson's peat extraction; nevertheless, the skull remained in its discovery position. Sahlström, deeming a thorough in situ investigation impractical, arranged for the entire peat block containing the partially embedded skeleton to be excised. The block was placed on a Masonite board and, along with several loose bones found in the bog, was transported by train to the Swedish History Museum in Stockholm in a wooden box. Following delivery, osteologist and anthropologist Elias Dahr excavated the skeleton from the peat block.

== Condition ==
Only portions of the skeleton had been preserved; the soft tissues had completely disintegrated and some bones, particularly many between the skull and the pelvis, were absent. The skull was well-preserved, with only the inner nasal region partially degraded. The condition of the remaining bones was less favourable.

== Clothing and associated items ==
No remains of clothing were recorded when the Luttra Woman was excavated in 1943. Researchers have suggested that she may nevertheless have been clothed because her skeleton remained largely in anatomical position.

=== Possible bindings ===
During the excavation, the Luttra Woman's lower legs were found extremely flexed, with her feet against the backs of her femurs. Osteologist Elias Dahr, who examined the block of peat containing her remains in 1943, concluded that she had been lying face down and suggested that her feet had been tied in this position. Both lower arms were beneath her pelvis. Whether her arms had also been tied could not be established.

No remains of rope were found. In 1947, archaeologist Axel Bagge, who had taken part in the initial examination of the find, interpreted the position of the body as evidence that she had been bound.

=== Flint arrowhead ===
A flint blade arrowhead had been found in the same bog in 1940, three years before the Luttra Woman was discovered. It was approximately 6 m (20 ft) north of her skeleton and, like her remains, about 1.2 metres (4 ft) below the surface. The arrowhead was of a type then attributed to the Middle Neolithic. Bagge regarded it as associated with the skeleton and used it to date the Luttra Woman to that period.

Later radiocarbon dating placed the Luttra Woman in the Early Neolithic, substantially earlier than the Middle Neolithic date proposed on the basis of the arrowhead.

== Scientific analysis ==
The Luttra Woman's extant bones (as of 2023)
Type	Weight	Ref.
Cranium	446 g (15.7 oz)	
Mandible	52 g (1.8 oz)	
Humerus (Right)	114 g (4.0 oz)	
Clavicle	18 g (0.6 oz)	
Scapula #1	42 g (1.5 oz)	
Scapula #2	31 g (1.1 oz)	
Radial bones	42 g (1.5 oz)	
Ulnas	49 g (1.7 oz)	
Hip bone (Right)	93 g (3.3 oz)	
Femurs	313 g (11.0 oz)	
Fibula	21 g (0.7 oz)	
Tibia	40 g (1.4 oz)	

=== Overview ===
The skeleton underwent its initial examination by Dahr following excavation. Axel Bagge, an archaeologist who collaborated on Dahr's examination, first reported the discovery in 1947 in the Swedish academic journal Fornvännen. A more comprehensive physical anthropological investigation was conducted by Sahlström, osteologist Nils-Gustaf Gejvall, and anatomist Carl-Herman Hjortsjö; their findings, including a detailed description of the remains, were published in 1952. In the intervening years, the skeleton has been subject to further scrutiny by additional researchers, notably archaeologist Sabine Sten and osteologist Torbjörn Ahlström during the 1990s, with Ahlström revisiting the study in the 2010s.

=== Body and health ===
Gejvall described her facial features as elegant and proportionally balanced, noting the consistency between her slender frame and the refined contours of her skull and jaw. She was characterised by short stature, with an estimated height of 145 cm (4 ft 9 in). In a 1960 monograph, Gejvall remarked that this was the shortest stature he had encountered in Swedish archaeological material. He referenced Dahr's study of remains from a Stone Age settlement on Gotland, Sweden's largest island, where the average female height was estimated at 153 cm (5 ft 0 in)—a figure Gejvall considered distinctly short—as a point of comparison.

=== Age ===
Dahr assessed the skeleton as that of a young female. Gejvall initially estimated the individual to be a woman aged 20–25 years; however, Sjögren et al. later proposed in 2017 that an age range of 15–20 years was more appropriate.

=== Dating ===
Pollen analysis dating indicated that the bones were slightly older than 4,000 years. As of 2017, radiocarbon dating had been employed on the skeleton three times: the first two analyses corroborated the pollen analysis result, whilst the third, conducted using accelerator mass spectrometry in 2015, yielded a range of 3928–3651 BC. This places the remains in the early or middle period of the Early Neolithic, establishing her as the earliest known Neolithic individual from Western Sweden at that time.

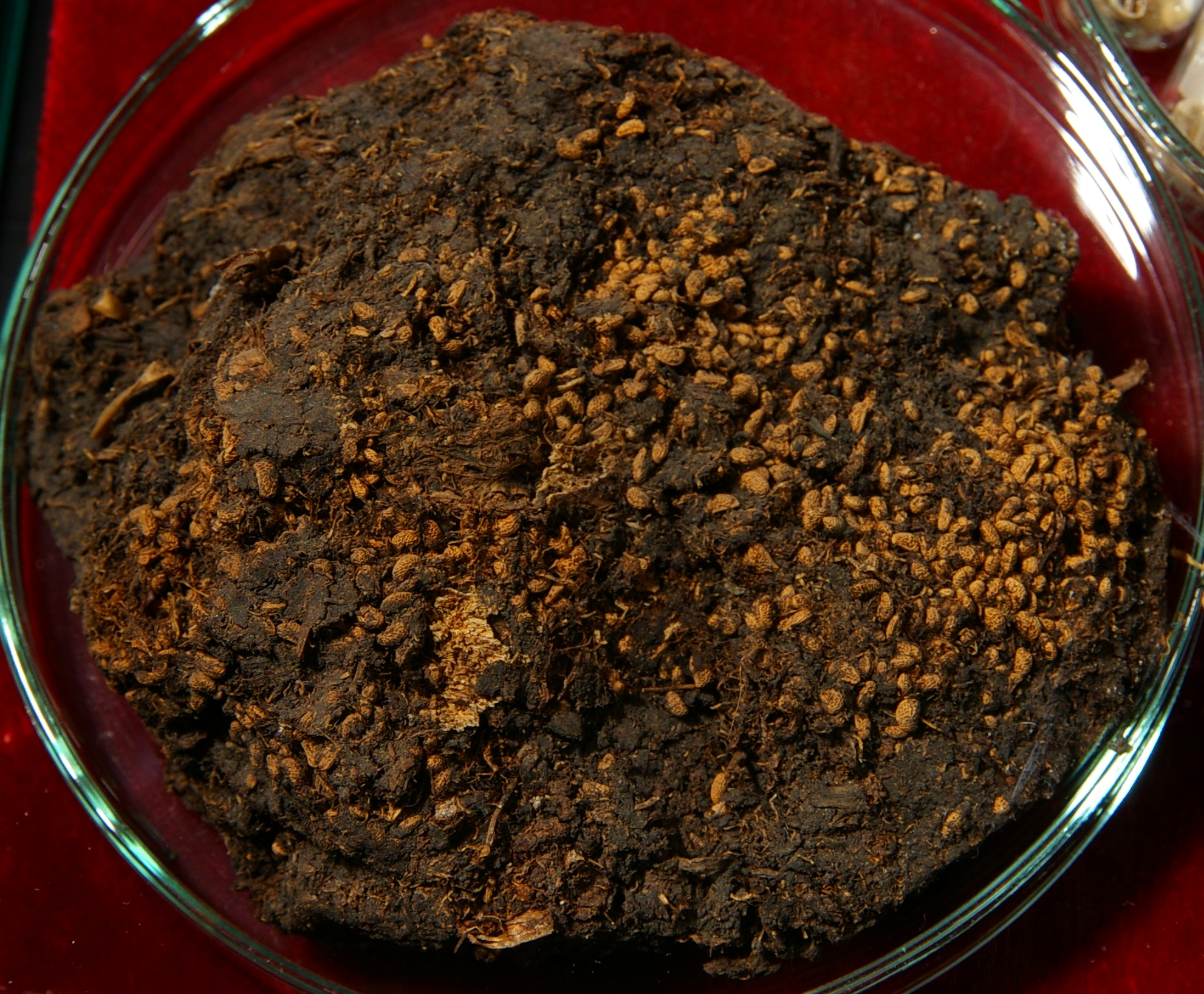
The Luttra Woman's stomach contents consisting of raspberry seeds

=== Diet ===
Where her stomach had once been, a cluster of small yellow-brown seeds remained, subsequently identified as those of European red raspberries (Rubus idaeus).

The substantial quantity of raspberries consumed shortly before death suggested that the individual likely died in late summer, in July or August. This final meal, along with her estimated age, led to her being nicknamed Hallonflickan, Swedish for 'Raspberry Girl'. (Note: Nils-Gustaf Gejvall stated in his 1960 English-language monograph Westerhus: Medieval Population and Church in the Light of Skeletal Remains that the Luttra Woman was "nowadays usually known under the name of "The Raspberry Girl" (Hallonflickan) [...]".)

=== Origin ===
Analysis of strontium and oxygen isotope ratios in the tooth enamel from one of the Luttra Woman's molars indicated that she likely originated from present-day Scania, the southernmost region of Sweden, before relocating to the Falbygden area later in life. (Note: Strontium is incorporated into bones and teeth due to its similarity to calcium, and the distribution of strontium isotopes tends to vary significantly from one geographical location to another. This is why the strontium signature in an individual's calcified structures can help determine the region they came from. Strontium incorporated in a developing tooth, in particular, does not change, partly because there is no blood supply to dentine or tooth enamel.) Attempts to extract DNA from her remains have been unsuccessful as of January 2023, due to the degradation of the bones by the bog environment.

=== Cause of death ===
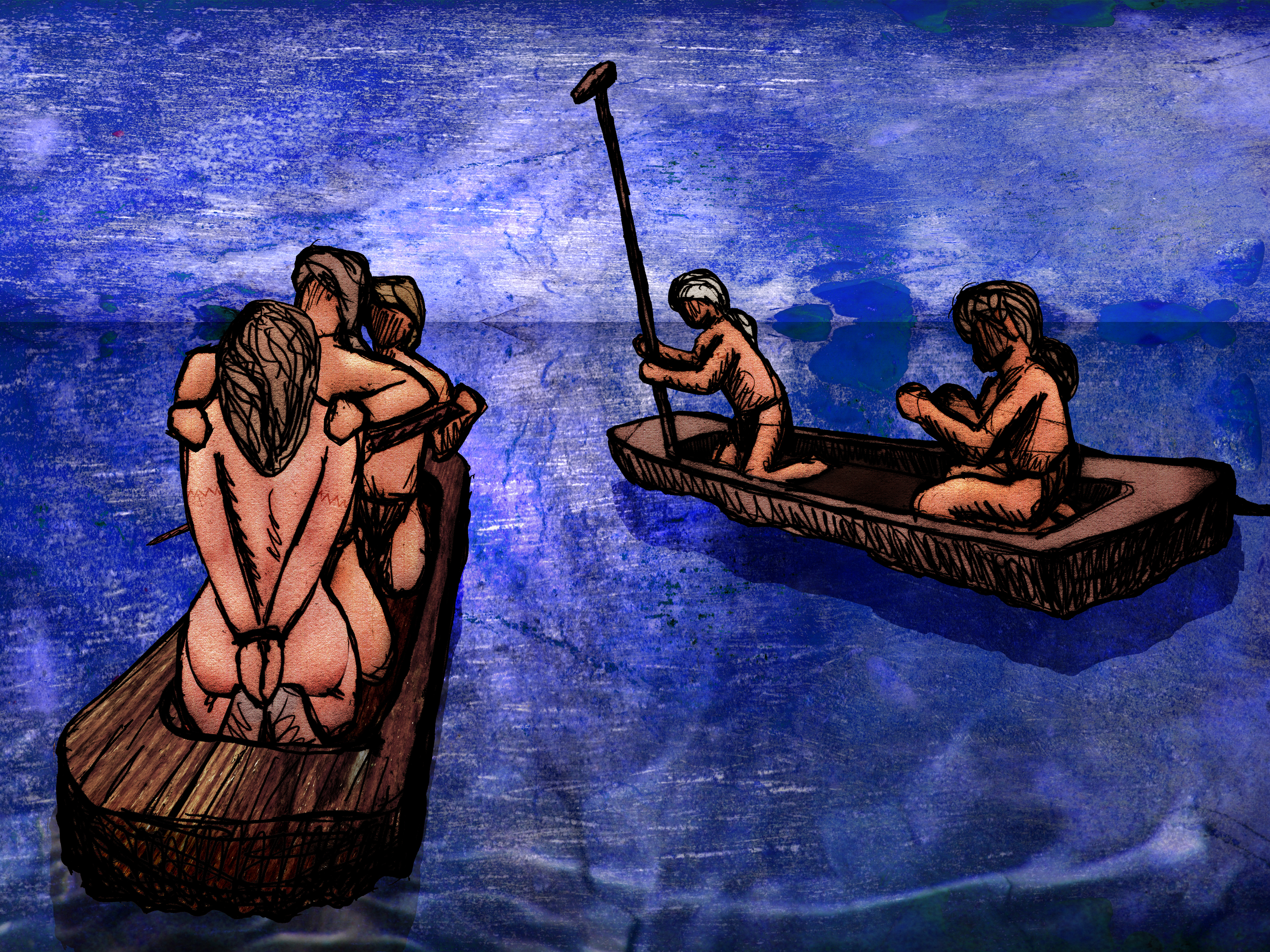
Artist's impression of the supposed human sacrifice ritual in which the Luttra Woman was drowned. By Gunnar Creutz, Falbygden Museum.

The Luttra Woman's skull shows a perforation below the left eye socket, likely the result of a chronic bone infection rather than trauma. The studies have reported no evidence of injuries or fatal diseases on her remains. At the time of discovery, her legs were positioned in a tight squatting posture, with the calves resting against the thighs. Bagge surmised that her legs had been bound, though the binding materials had not been preserved in the bog. Sahlström noted that the skull's imprint on the peat block suggested a prone position; Dahr concurred, concluding she had been lying face down. She appeared to these researchers to have been placed in shallow water at or shortly after her death, remaining undisturbed in this restrained position until the discovery. Mönarpa mossar would have been, at least partly, lakes during the Neolithic times. Bagge postulated that she had been deliberately drowned, proposing the hypothesis that she was the victim of either a human sacrifice ritual or a witch execution. Ahlström and Sten noted that some Early Neolithic remains in Denmark bore indications of similar sacrificial practices. An alternative explanation posited that the bindings were part of a water burial ritual for the Luttra Woman's corpse, following her death from unrelated causes.

== Exhibition and reconstruction ==
The 1945 text Tio tusen år i Sverige ('Ten Thousand Years in Sweden'), which accompanied the Swedish History Museum's exhibition of prehistoric and archaeological finds, did not mention the Luttra Woman, despite her remains being part of the exhibition at that time. In the early 1970s, the skeleton was removed from display and placed in the museum's storage facility under the inventory number SHM 23163. In 1994, the skeleton was loaned to the Falbygden Museum in Falköping and made available for public viewing. Since then, it has been part of the museum's permanent exhibition Forntid på Falbygden ('Prehistory in Falbygden'). The museum expanded the exhibition in June 2011 with a reconstructed bust of her, created by Oscar Nilsson, an archaeologist and model-maker trained in sculpture. He had worked on commissions from museums to reconstruct Swedish remains from various historical periods—such as the Barum Woman (c. 7th millennium BC), the Granhammar Man (9th century BC), Estrid (11th century), and Birger Jarl (13th century)—using forensic methods originally developed to identify crime victims from their remains.

External image
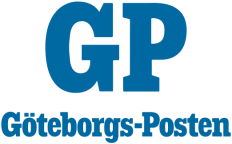
- via Göteborgs-Posten, a Swedish-language daily newspaper
- Luttra Woman's reconstructed bust, by Oscar Nilsson

To create the bust of the Luttra Woman, Nilsson arranged for her skull to be CT scanned at the Karolinska Institute, a research-focused medical university in Stockholm. Utilising the scanned data, he commissioned a full-scale replica of the skull to be 3D printed in polyvinyl chloride, and manually affixed dozens of markers to the replica to indicate the estimated soft tissue thickness. He then moulded facial muscles, and added a thin layer of clay skin onto the replica for the finer details of her facial features. Nilsson remarked in an interview that the skeleton appeared distinctly feminine to him; he shaped her face accordingly, incorporating a narrow nasal bridge, which reportedly resulted in "a fully modern appearance" rather than the stereotypical visage of a Stone Age woman. In the absence of DNA analysis, he was compelled to make assumptions regarding her hair and eye colour.

== See also ==
- List of Swedish bog bodies
- Nordic Stone Age – Time period in Scandinavia
- Prehistoric Sweden (c. 12000 BC – c. 800 AD)
