= Saralanj, Shirak =

Saralanj Սարալանջ
- Location within Armenia Location within Shirak
- Coordinates: 40°37′31″N 44°01′13″E
- Country: Armenia
- Province: Shirak
- Municipality: Artik

Population (2011)
  - Total: 1,181
- Time zone: UTC+4
  - Summer (DST): UTC+5

Saralanj (Armenian: Սարալանջ) is a village in the Artik Municipality of the Shirak Province of Armenia.

== Demographics ==
Historical population
Year	Pop.	±% p.a.
1831	139	—
1897	903	+2.88%
1926	1,182	+0.93%
1939	1,014	−1.17%
1959	999	−0.07%
1970	1,135	+1.17%
1979	958	−1.87%
1989	1,093	+1.33%
2001	1,115	+0.17%
2011	1,181	+0.58%
