= Bashgyugh =

Village in Shirak, Armenia

Bashgyugh Բաշգյուղ
- Location within Armenia Location within Shirak
- Coordinates: 40°57′N 43°58′E
- Country: Armenia
- Province: Shirak
- Municipality: Ashotsk
- Elevation: 2,020 m (6,630 ft)

Population (2011)
  - Total: 64
- Time zone: UTC+4
  - Summer (DST): UTC+5

Bashgyugh (Armenian: Բաշգյուղ) is a village in the Ashotsk Municipality of the Shirak Province of Armenia. Statistical Committee of Armenia reported its population was 53 in 2010, down from 68 at the 2001 census.

== Demographics ==
Historical population
Year	Pop.	±% p.a.
1873	598	—
1906	269	−2.39%
1919	420	+3.49%
1931	214	−5.46%
1959	129	−1.79%
1970	113	−1.20%
1979	74	−4.59%
2001	68	−0.38%
2011	64	−0.60%
