= Dprabak =

Village in Gegharkunik, Armenia

Dprabak Դպրաբակ
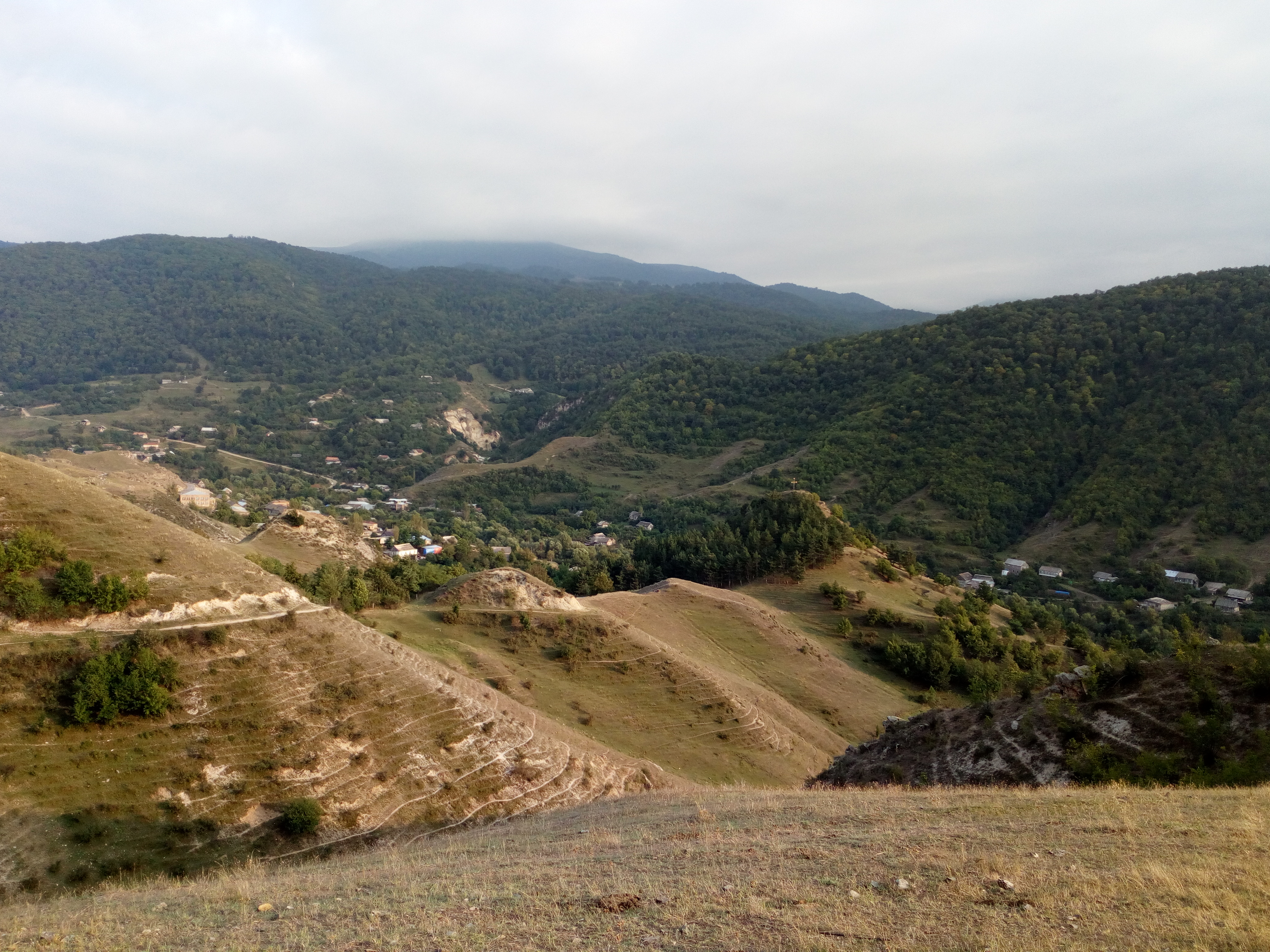
- A view of Dprabak

- Location within Armenia Location within Gegharkunik
- Coordinates: 40°41′11″N 45°07′35″E
- Country: Armenia
- Province: Gegharkunik
- Municipality: Chambarak
- Founded: 1778
- Elevation: 1,216 m (3,990 ft)

Population (2011)
  - Total: 489
- Time zone: UTC+4 (AMT)
- Postal code: 1310

Dprabak (Armenian: Դպրաբակ) is a village in the Chambarak Municipality of the Gegharkunik Province of Armenia. In 1988-1989 Armenian refugees from Azerbaijan settled in the village.

== History ==
The village was founded in 1778 by emigrants from Artsvashen and Karabakh.

== Gallery ==
Ruined church in Dprabak

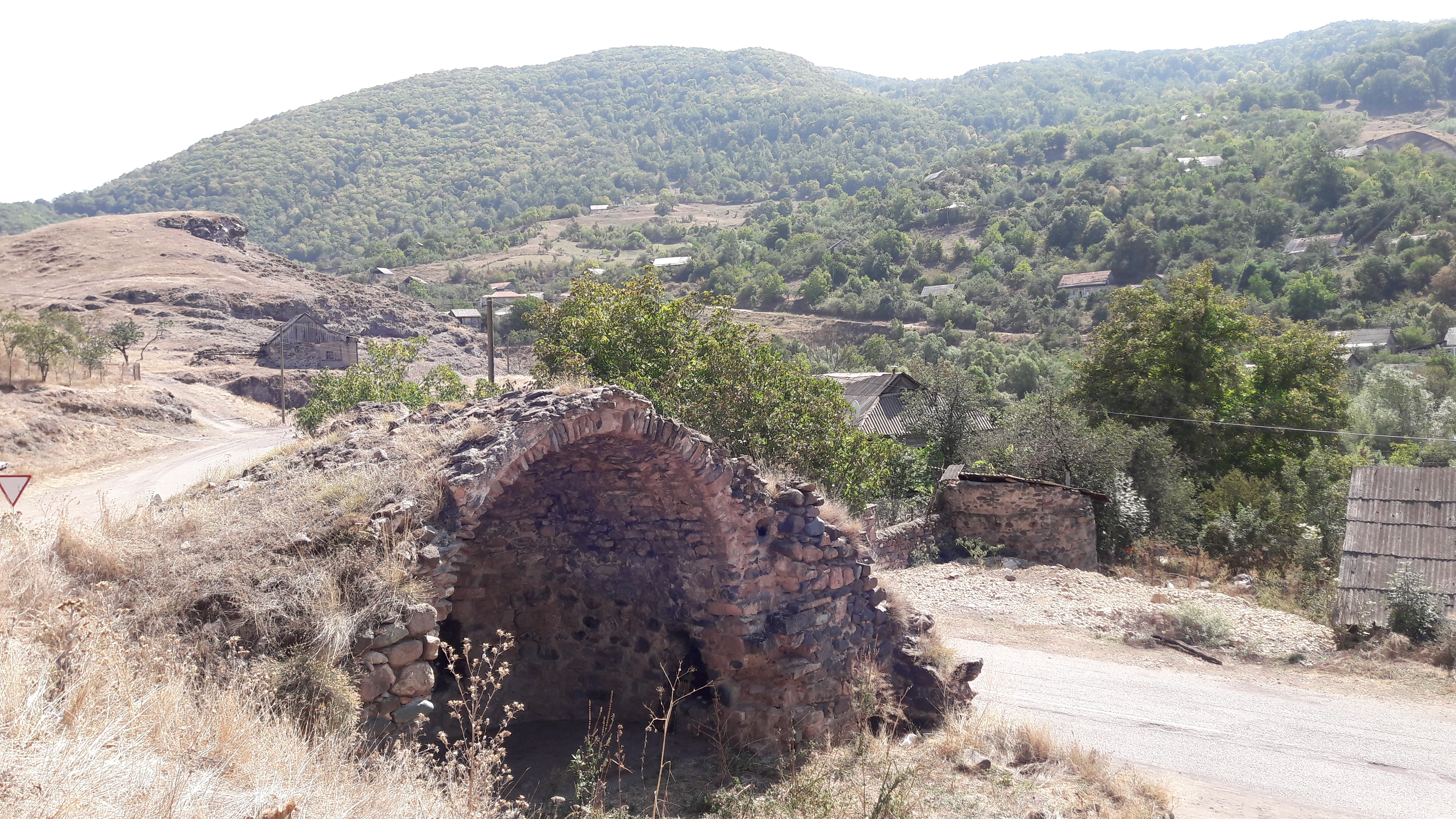

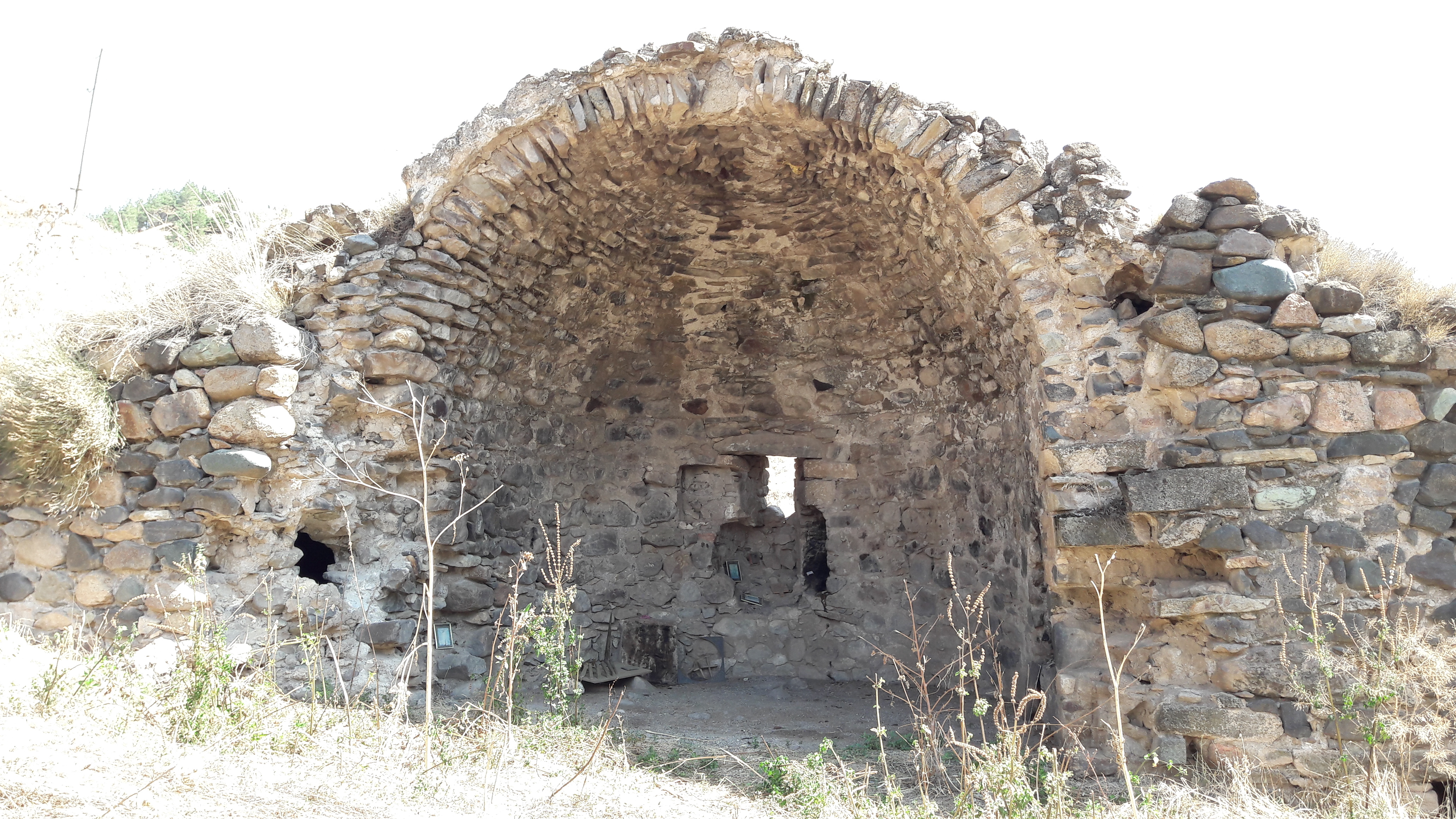
