= Barum Woman =

Mesolithic Swedish museum skeleton

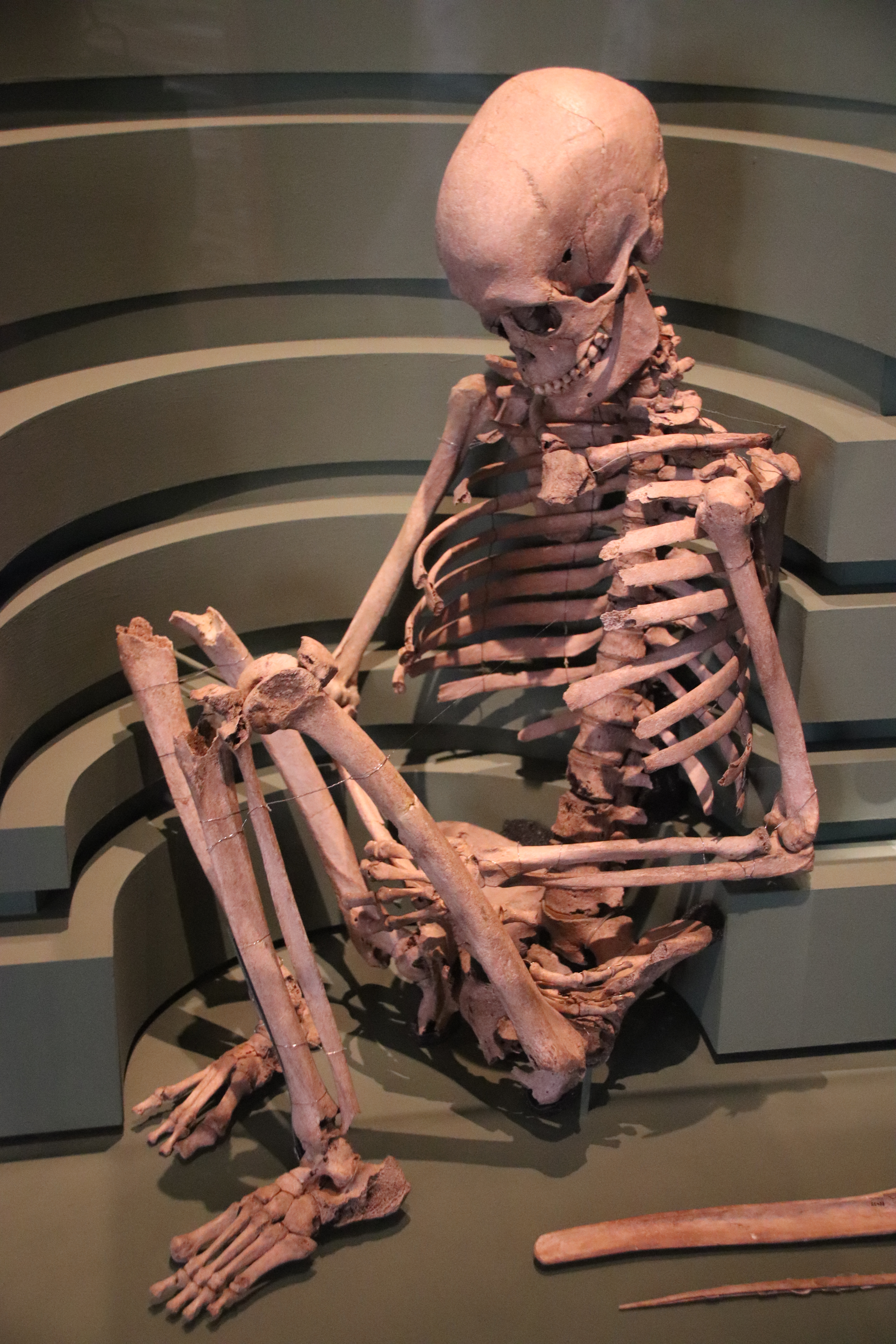
- Barum Woman's skeleton in 2012
- Died: 7010 – 6540 BCE; Present-day Scania, Sweden
- Body discovered: 27 May 1939 by Sven Eriksson
- Resting place: Swedish History Museum, Stockholm, Sweden

The Barum Woman (Swedish: Barumskvinnan; died 7010–6540 BCE), formerly known as The Bäckaskog Woman (Bäckaskogskvinnan), is one of the best-preserved skeletal finds in Sweden from the Maglemosian culture of the Mesolithic. She was found in 1939 in Barum and is now in the Swedish History Museum in Stockholm.

== Discovery ==
She was found near the shore of Oppmannasjön at Barum village, near Bäckaskog, northeast of Kristianstad, in the county of Scania. Archaeologist Folke Hansen excavated the grave on June 2, 1939.

== Description and research ==
The woman was buried in a 40 to 60 cm (16 to 24 in) wide pit about 1.2 m (4 ft) deep in a semi-sitting reclining position. Until the 1970s, the skeleton was considered to belong to a man, but is now after long discussion considered female. Burial items included a flint-edged bone point (formerly called bird arrow) and a chisel-like bone tool of split pipe moose bone, with one end having the bone end preserved and the other rounded and sharpened. Both artifacts are now considered to date the find to the Maglemosian period.

During the 1940s and early 1950s there was a heated discussion about the dating of the grave between, on the one hand, Otto Rydbeck, professor emeritus in Lund, and Dr. Oskar Lidén and Dr. Carl-Axel Althin, also in Lund.

=== Display ===
The grave has been at the Swedish History Museum in Stockholm since 1939, after the Swedish National Heritage Board rejected Professor Forssander's request in 1939 that the find be allocated to the Historical Museum at Lund University (LUHM). A letter from private individuals in Kristianstad, later supported by the Kristianstad Cultural Board and the County Museum in Kristianstad, requested that she be deposited at the County Museum in Kristianstad. This request was rejected by the Swedish National Heritage Board and the government decided according to their proposal. The woman's grave has been on display at the Swedish History Museum in Stockholm since 1943. First in the exhibition "10 000 years in Sweden" and most recently in the exhibition "Ancient Times". During new exhibitions, the position of the woman in the grave has shifted and in recent years there has been a discussion about the position of the woman in the grave at the time of burial. In 2007, Stig Welinder and Sabine Sten published an article "The eternal traveler from Barum" which even questions whether she was buried whole or dismembered before burial. Their reasoning is unconvincing and must be regarded as highly speculative and unlikely.

=== Fisherman – mother of several children ===
Since hunting and fishing tools were found in the grave, and the skeleton was difficult to sex, it was long thought that the find was the skeleton of a man who died when he was 40–50 years old. "He" was described by the excavator Folke Hansen as the "Fisherman from Barum" in an essay in Handlingar angående Villands härad ("Documents concerning Villand's hundred") 1941. In 1970, after a murder case that led to new results about traces left on the skeleton after childbirth, osteologist Nils-Gustaf Gejvall was able to establish that the skeleton's pelvic bones and pubic bones indicated that it was a woman; in addition, a woman who Gejvall assumed had given birth to between 10 and 12 children. Now it was suddenly a mother, who was both a hunter and a fisherman. Gejvall wrote an article with the title "The fisherman from Barum – mother of several children! Palaeoanatomic finds in the skeleton from Bäckaskog." In the late 1970s, Danish archaeologists started a discussion about the flint-edged bone point, suggesting it was not a grave offering but the weapon that killed her. This conclusion has turned out to be based on loose assumptions, and not least the fact that the point was intact and undamaged strongly suggests that it was attached as a grave offering.

=== Age and dating ===
The Swedish History Museum used to call her The Bäckaskog Woman, but this name led to a dispute with local opinion and Villands Heritage Association. They uphold Gejvall's sex determination but question that she was a mother of many children. Studies of the teeth have been interpreted as the woman being about 35–45 years old when she died, adhesions in sutures in the skull and other signs of age in the skeleton have been interpreted as an age of about 40.

A first C14 dating in 1977 (to about 7000 years of age i.e. 5000 BC) using older technology that probably gave too low a result has been corrected by a new measurement using better technology. It has made it more likely that she died between 7010 and 6540 BC, during the late Maglemosian culture, making her one of Sweden's oldest preserved female skeletons. She is considered one of the real gems of the Swedish History Museum and has become something of Swedish archaeology's "Cover Girl".

== Naming ==
For a long time, the Villands härads heritage association and the Swedish History Museum used different names for the find. The people of Scania preferred The Woman from Barum (Barumskvinnan) and the History Museum The Bäckaskog Woman. On May 11, 2016, the official name The Woman from Barum was also adopted by the Swedish History Museum.

== Legacy ==
At the site in Scania, a memorial stone has been erected with the text: "The ancient fisherwoman from Barum was buried here."

== See also ==
- Ötzi - Europe's oldest known natural human mummy, from the Chalcolithic (Copper Age).
- Grauballe Man - Danish 3rd century BC bog body.
- Tollund Man - Danish 5th century BC bog body.
- Luttra Woman - Swedish skeletonised bog body from the Early Neolithic.
