= Çaykənd, Dashkasan =

Çaykənd
- Location within Azerbaijan
- Coordinates: 40°37′35″N 46°06′00″E
- Country: Azerbaijan
- Rayon: Dashkasan
- Time zone: UTC+4 (AZT)
  - Summer (DST): UTC+5 (AZT)

Çaykənd (known as Kətişen, Ketashen or Ketishen until 1992) is a village in the municipality of Çovdar in the Dashkasan Rayon of Azerbaijan.
