= Getik, Vayots Dzor =

Getik
- Location within Armenia Location within Vayots Dzor
- Coordinates: 39°41′48″N 45°33′34″E
- Country: Armenia
- Marz (Province): Vayots Dzor
- Time zone: UTC+4 ( )
  - Summer (DST): UTC+5 ( )

Getik (Armenian: Գետիկ; formerly, Chaykend and Ghai-kend) is a town in the Vayots Dzor Province of Armenia.

== See also ==
- Vayots Dzor Province
