= Çaykənd, Shaki =

Çaykənd
- Location within Azerbaijan Location within Shaki-Zagatala Economic Region
- Coordinates: 40°55′58″N 47°20′48″E
- Country: Azerbaijan
- Rayon: Shaki
- Time zone: UTC+4 (AZT)
  - Summer (DST): UTC+5 (AZT)

Çaykənd (also, Chaykend) is a village in the Shaki Rayon of Azerbaijan.
