= MKG Group =

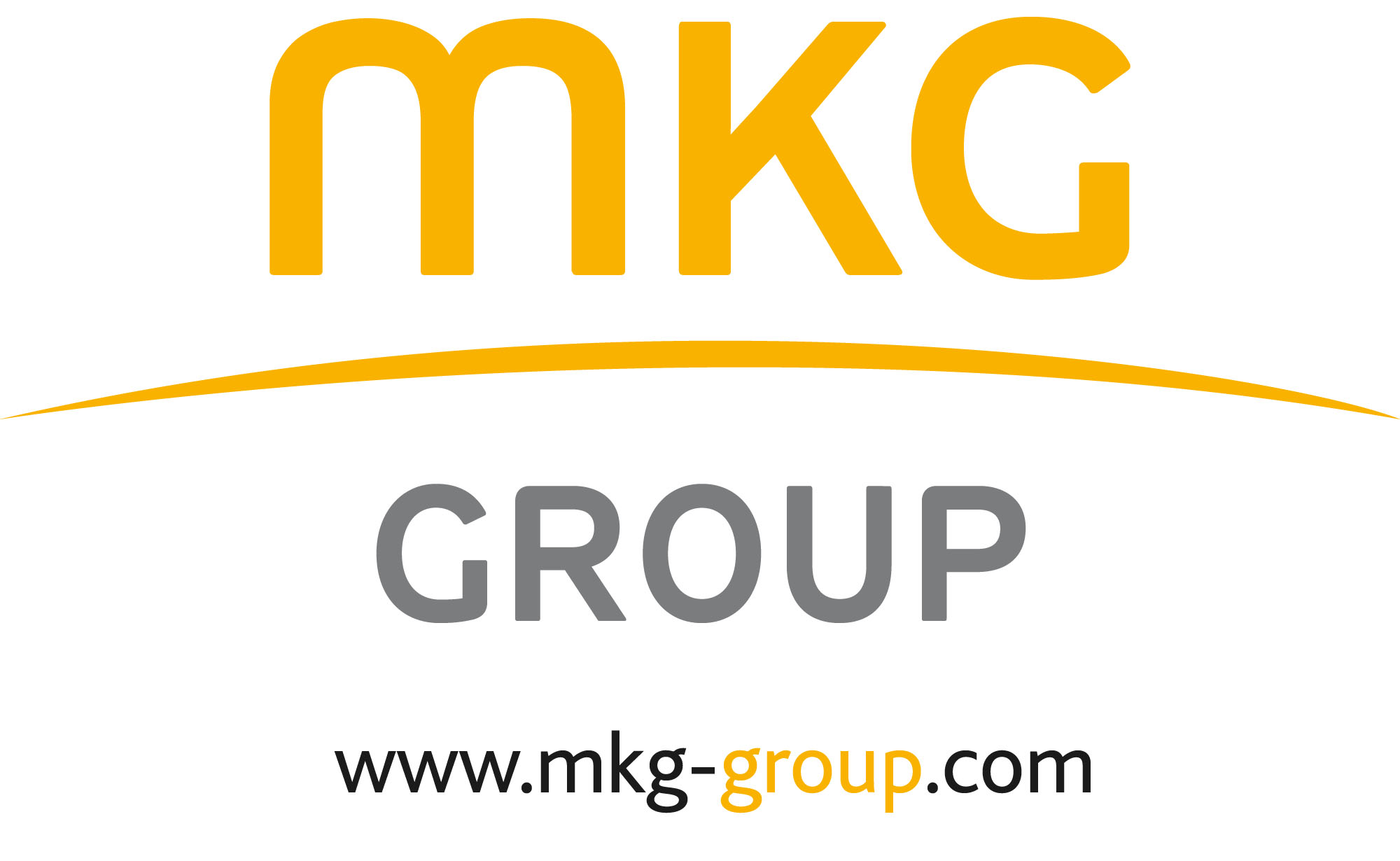
- Type: Limited Company
- Industry: Hospitality, Hotels, Tourism
- Founded: 1985
- Headquarters: Paris, France
- Area served: EMEA & Worldwide
- Key people: Georges Panayotis (Founder, Chairman & CEO)
- Products: Market Benchmarking (supply, demand, pipeline), Sector Market Research, Feasibility Studies, Valuations, Quality Control & Mystery Shopping, Media platform, Hospitality Events/conferences
- Number of employees: 110
- Website: www.mkg-group.com

MKG Group is a consulting and market research firm based in Paris, France. The group operates various divisions within the tourism, hotel and hospitality sector, namely monitoring global trends in supply, demand and pipeline growth, including the worldwide chain hotel brand and chain hotel group rankings, as well as conducting specialised industry research for stakeholders, private investors, developers, hoteliers (chain groups and independent properties), government and tourism associations, banking and financial institutions, and hedge funds.

MKG is the official industry monitor for a number of European tourism organisations, such as the French Ministry of Tourism, Tourism Office Lyon, Tourism office Brussels, offices in Spain, the Netherlands, and the European City Marketing Association (ECM). MKG also regularly supplies various other tourism organisations and NGOs with trends and analytical reports, including fractions of the European Union, UN such as the United Nations Conference on Trade and Development and the UNWTO's International Labour Organization, as well as a number of hospitality educational institutions in Europe. MKG’s database represents the largest industry performance sample in the EMEA region, supplied directly by all leading international chain hotels, as well as many regional groups and independent properties.

MKG is associated with MKG Hospitality, HotelCompSet, MKG Qualiting, Hospitality-ON.com media platform, the Global Lodging Forum (GLF), Worldwide Hospitality Awards, and Hotel Class, the official hotel rating agency in France. In 2006, MKG was ranked 20th in the national classification of the top 100 market research and opinion institutes by Marketing Magazine.

== History ==
MKG Group was established by Georges Panayotis in Paris in 1985 to service the hotel sector. Soon after, the group began tracking hotel data and trends in supply and demand, as well as conducting research studies for the sector. In 1994, the company launched its first publication Hôtels et marketing, later to be known as HTR Magazine and now Hospitality-ON. This was followed by the newspaper Hôtel Restau Hebdo in 2000, and the first Hermès Awards for the hotel and hospitality industry (later to become the Worldwide Hospitality Awards) were awarded in the same year. It opened offices in London in 2007 and in Berlin and Cyprus in 2008. In 2010 it launched the first Hospitality Management Schools Awards.

The company created the first classification of hotel groups and hotel chains in 1995, and the following year it launched the inaugural Hotel Makers Forum, later to be known as the Global Lodging Forum (GLF). In 2002 it took over the company Network Systems, which specialised in computer software for database processing and e-procurement platforms; and the next year MKG Qualiting produced the first online quality database to enable real time consultation and analysis of a particular hotel with respect to quality criteria. This was followed in 2004 by the creation of the HotelCompset Daily platform, which provides subscribing hotels a tool to track daily and monthly activity and compare key performance indicators. An online customer satisfaction survey platform known as Ola Kala was launched in 2009.

The company has COFRAC accreditation, to lead grading inspection of hotels 1 to 5 stars in France under new classification standards from January under the brand HotelClass. In October, MKG Qualiting extended its accreditation to perform inspections for the classification of serviced apartments and touristic residences under the brand ResidenceClass.

== MKG Group Divisions ==
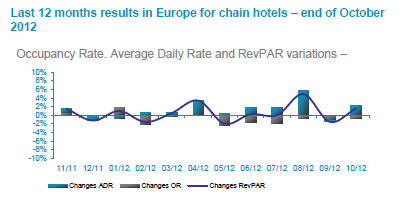
HotelCompSet performance indicators in Europe

MKG Hotel Database

MKG’s database HotelCompSet, contains a sample of over 200 brands and 11,000 corporate chain hotels, representing more than one million rooms throughout the world. HotelCompSet provides daily, monthly and yearly monitoring of hotel key performance indicators and analyses of its sample, namely Occupancy Rate (OR), Average Daily Rate (ADR) and Revenue Per Available Room (RevPAR). This is used by hoteliers for yield/revenue management strategies, as well as by financial institutions, hedge funds, investors and developers for financial reporting and forecasting trends. Results are revealed via the HotelCompSet online application, as well as monthly HIT reports for Europe and the MEA regions. Additional benchmark reports reveal trends for the upper upscale/luxury segments, country markets France, Germany and Spain. MKG’s database also tracks hotel supply and pipeline growth trends, as well as chain hotel penetration rates, i.e. share of chain hotels in a given market and globally, as well the worldwide chain hotel group and hotel brand rankings.

MKG Hospitality

Major areas of MKG Hospitality include industry market research, financial feasibility studies and consulting for large-scale tourism infrastructure projects, such as hotels and mixed-use developments, as well as independent hotel property and portfolio valuations, and tourism campaigns.

MKG Qualiting

Quality control in the fields of tourism, hotels and hospitality. This includes business Mystery shopping and audit visits, telephone surveys, and Ola Kala online customer satisfaction survey.

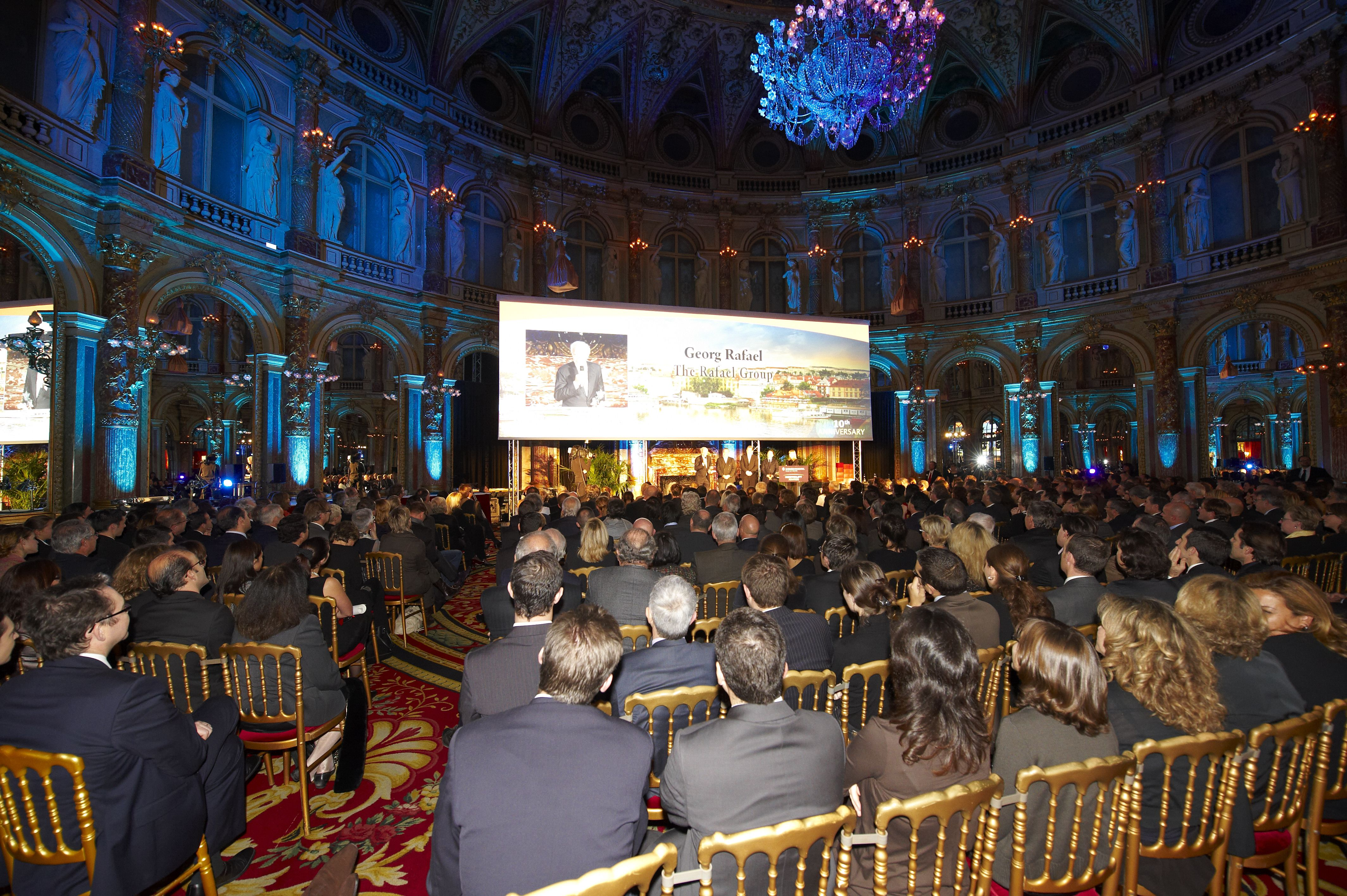
MKG’s annual worldwide hospitality awards held in Paris, France

Press & Events

HTR Magazine was established in 1985, a bilingual publication (French & English) that covered news, interviews, hotel industry analysis and trends from MKG’s database of statistics. In 2011, MKG launched Hospitality-ON.com, the new version of HTR that combined the printed publication and online media platform.

MKG and Hospitality-ON host the Worldwide Hospitality Awards at the InterContinental Paris le Grand Hotel, and the Global Lodging Forum (GLF). In 2010, MKG launched the first Hospitality Management Schools Awards.

Other activities:

Hotel Class is the official hotel rating agency in France. This is the first company specialised in hospitality sector to have obtained the COFRAC accreditation, to lead grading inspection of hotels 1 to 5 stars in France under new classification standards from January under the brand HotelClass®. This was extended to ResidenceClass for serviced apartments and touristic residences.

Georges Panayotis

== Management ==
Georges Panayotis is the founder, chairman and CEO of MKG Group. He left Greece at the age of 18 to study political science. After gaining a management degree at the Paris Dauphine University he started work at Novotel, now part of the Accor Group, and became International Marketing Director. Panayotis established MKG after leaving the Accor group in 1985.

== Offices ==
MKG Group’s corporate head office is in central Paris. Other office locations include London, Berlin and Nicosia in Cyprus. In 2012, MKG opened satellite offices in São Paulo, Brazil and Melbourne, Australia.

== See also ==
- Hospitality
- Tourism
- Hotels
- Market Research
