= Rockbridge Associates =

Rockbridge Associates, Inc.
- Industry: Market Research
- Founded: 1992
- Headquarters: Great Falls, Virginia, United States
- Key people: Charles Colby - President; Gina Woodall - Senior Vice President
- Services: Customer Satisfaction and Loyalty, New Product Development Research, Customer and Market Segmentation, Website Usability, Brand Equity, Event and Meeting Evaluations
- Website: www.rockresearch.com

Rockbridge Associates, Inc. is a market research firm located in Great Falls, Virginia, founded in 1992. It has conducted research in areas including technology readiness and green technology.

== History ==
Rockbridge Associates, Inc. was founded in 1992 by Charles Colby.

In the late 1990s, Rockbridge began conducting a series of pilot tests with corporate clients like American Online and Sallie Mae to create a Technology Readiness Index. In 1999 the company released the first annual National Technology Readiness Survey (NTRS), which was awarded top honors by the Cable & Telecommunications Association for Marketing (CTAM).

Ananthanarayanan Parasuraman collaborated with Rockbridge to publish a paper in 2000 in the Journal of Services Research on the Technology Readiness Index (TRI). Rockbridge began licensing the TRI for commercial use under the name Techqual. Free licenses were granted to scholars around the world. Rockbridge also became a partner in the Center for Excellence in Service at the University of Maryland, College Park's Robert H. Smith School of Business.

In 2001, Parasuraman and Charles L. Colby published a book on consumer technology behavior, Techno-Ready Marketing: How and Why Your Customers Adopt Technology.

In 2004, Rockbridge partnered with Dr. Tom Reynolds to implement a means-end methodology based on laddering interviews on the Internet.

By 2006, Rockbridge Associates became the market research partner of the Consumer Electronics Association (CEA), and operated the CEA's market research division until 2008.

In 2008, Rockbridge representatives spoke at the American Marketing Association's Frontiers in Services Conference, and the Marketing Research Association's Annual Conference.

In 2008, Rockbridge launched its Green Technology Index, which measures receptiveness to innovative green behaviors and products.

In 2009, Rockbridge worked with Network Solutions and the University of Maryland, College Park to release the Small Business Success Index, which was featured on Fox News.

In 2012, Gina Woodall became the President of Rockbridge, while Charles Colby, assumed the role of Chief Methodologist.
