= Akunk, Aragatsotn =

Akunk Ակունք
- Location within Armenia Location within Aragatsotn
- Coordinates: 40°25′37″N 43°54′24″E
- Country: Armenia
- Province: Aragatsotn
- Municipality: Talin
- Founded: 1829

Population (2011)
  - Total: 601
- Time zone: UTC+4
  - Summer (DST): UTC+5

Akunk (Armenian: Ակունք) is a village in the Talin Municipality of the Aragatsotn Province of Armenia founded in 1829.
