= KS&R =

Marketing company in the United States

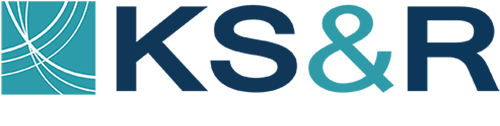
- Company type: Private
- Founded: 1983; 43 years ago
- Headquarters: Syracuse, New York, United States
- No. of locations: New York City; Memphis, Tennessee; Seattle, Washington; Frankfurt, Germany
- Industry: Market Research
- Employees: 115
- Website: ksrinc.com

KS&R is a nationally recognized strategic consultancy and marketing research firm specializing in Business Services, Entercom & Recreation, Healthcare, Retail & E-Commerce, Technology, and Transportation & Logistics.

The Firm is privately held and headquartered in Syracuse, New York. KS&R serves clients globally in more than 100 countries and in over 50 languages.

== History ==
KS&R was founded in 1983 as a spin-off of the Syracuse Research Corporation (SRC), a not-for-profit corporation. In 1985, KS&R began operating INSITE, an in-house contact center for survey research with 110 desks.

According to Marketing News magazine, since 2007 KS&R has been among the 50 largest market research firms, listed by revenue generated in the U.S. In 2012 the company was named the number one market research firm in the country for customer satisfaction by the Survey of Market Research Supplier Quality and Value by Prevision Corporation and Inside Research.

KS&R offers strategic consulting, brand building, and market sensing. Recently, KS&R has expanded its knowledge base with its new Experience Lab known as Tumble and Buyer Persona Institute (BPI), a division of KS&R that was founded in 2010 to give B2B companies insight into what their prospective customers need to know and experience before they will buy.
