= Akunk, Kotayk =

Akunk Ակունք
- Village
- Location within Armenia
- Coordinates: 40°16′09″N 44°41′01″E
- Country: Armenia
- Marz (Province): Kotayk
- Founded: 1829

Government
  - Mayor: Hunan Rubenyan

Area
  - Total: 23.7 km^{2} (9.2 sq mi)
- Elevation: 1,400 m (4,600 ft)

Population (2008)
  - Total: 1,941
  - Density: 81.9/km^{2} (212/sq mi)
- Time zone: UTC+4 ( )

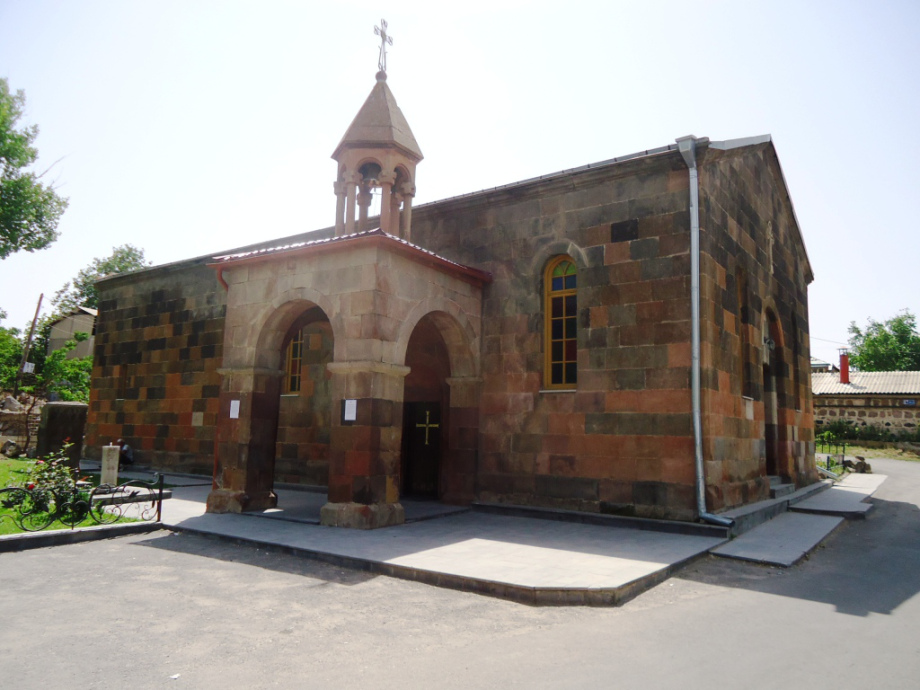
SOURB KARAPET CHURCH, AKOONCK VILLAGE, KOTAYK REGION, ARMENIA.

Akunk (Armenian: Ակունք, also Romanized as Akunq; formerly until 1946, Bashgyukh) is a village in the Kotayk Province of Armenia, located 6 km northeast of Abovyan and situated at the foot of Mount Hatis. The village was founded in 1829 by Armenian immigrants from Persia and Western Armenia, while the current population is Armenian and Yazidi. The local economy is heavily dependent on agriculture, based primarily on grain farming, orchard cultivation, and cattle-breeding. Akunk has a school, house of culture, library, and east of the village is a shrine of Poghos-Petros of the Late Middle Ages. A cyclopean fortress is also nearby.

== See also ==
- Kotayk Province
