= EyeSee Research =

American market research company

EyeSee
- Industry: Market Research
- Founded: Belgium (2012)
- Founders: Olivier Tilleuil
- Headquarters: Ghent, Belgium & NY, USA
- Area served: Worldwide
- Services: Online behavioral testing: Pack, Planogram, Retail media, Social media, and TVC, using a mixed-method approach that includes eye tracking, emotion recognition, RTM, virtual shopping, navigation, survey and more.
- Number of employees: 150 (2020)
- Website: www. eyesee-research.com

EyeSee is a tech-enabled consumer research vendor.

EyeSee has global coverage from its hubs in the USA (NYC), Belgium (Antwerp), France (Paris), United Kingdom (London) and Serbia (Belgrade), Mexico (Mexico City) and Singapore.

== Technology ==
Among most sought-after solutions are tests designed for packaging, planograms, claims, social media ads, TV commercials (TVCs), and e-commerce websites.

EyeSee uses a mixed-method approach, actively combining behavioral research methods, such as eye tracking (mapping eye gaze), emotion recognition, reaction time measurement, navigation, click tracking etc. with more conventional methods like survey. This helps provide more predictive insights, and overcome limitations and biases of using single method approach.

Further, EyeSee utilizes the capabilities of its in-house design teams to create realistic virtual simulations of stores, social media platforms, and e-commerce sites. These simulated environments are designed to capture detailed and authentic consumer behaviors, providing valuable data for analysis in various testing scenarios.

EyeSee also incorporates AI technology, specifically AI-powered Eye Tracking, which is built upon a decade of expertise in real Eye Tracking and trained using 11.5 million eye-gaze data points. This technology provides key performance indicators (KPIs) such as AI Visibility and AI Attention, as well as predictive heatmaps. It is considered an ideal solution for conducting fast and cost-effective Pack Checks and Pack Screenings.

== History ==
EyeSee was founded in 2012 by Olivier Tilleuil, who remains an active Board member. The company is currently led by CEO Joris De Bruyne.

== Recognition ==
in 2012, EyeSee won Bizidee – the biggest entrepreneurship competition in Belgium. The company was one of the Top 10 Flemish technology businesses of the future according to De Standaard. In 2014, Olivier Tilleuil won the ‘BRAVE’ Award at 2014 BAQMaR Conference, organized by the Belgian Association for Quali and Quanti Research. In May 2015, the company won Global Mobile Innovator Competition in NYC.

After a strong start, EyeSee has earned numerous industry accolades over the years. These include being ranked as the #10 research supplier in the 2024 GRIT Business & Innovation Report, as well as receiving multiple Quirk's Excellence Awards: MR Fearless Leader (2021), MR Research Supplier (2020), Advertising Research Project of the Year with Twitter (2020), and Global MFR Project with Microsoft (2019).
