= Çaykənd, Shusha =

Village in Shusha, Azerbaijan

Chaykend / Akunk Çaykənd / Ակունք
- Location within Azerbaijan
- Coordinates: 39°47′03″N 46°36′02″E
- Country: Azerbaijan
  - District: Shusha
- Time zone: UTC+4

Chaykend (Azerbaijani: Çaykənd) or Akunk (Armenian: Ակունք) is a village in the Shusha District of Azerbaijan. The village had an Azerbaijani-majority population prior to their exodus during the First Nagorno-Karabakh War.
