= Luttra =

Locality in Västra Götaland County, Sweden

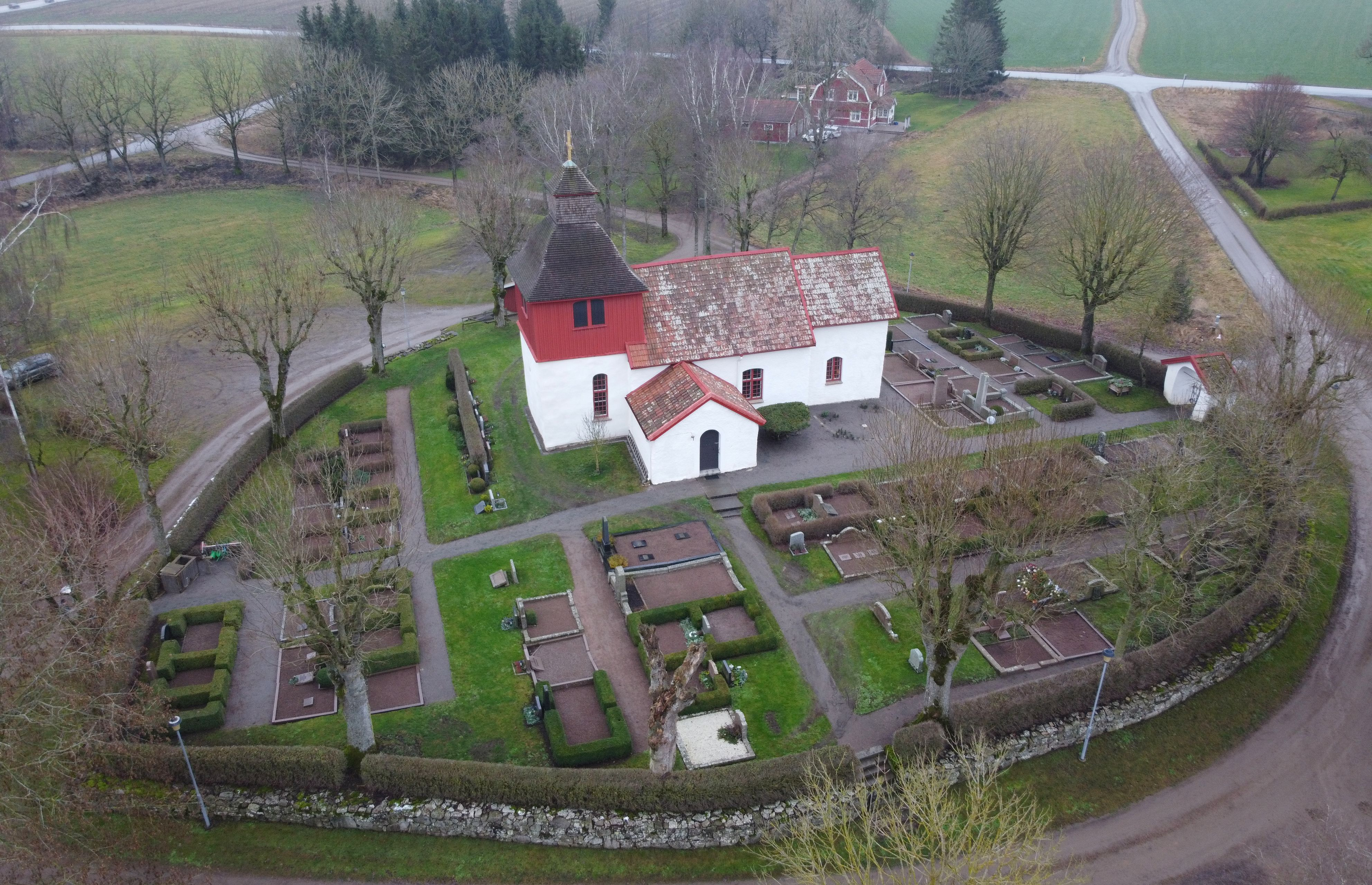
- Church in Luttra

- Location within Västra Götaland Location within Sweden
- Coordinates: 58°07′55″N 13°33′53″E
- Country: Sweden
- County: Västra Götaland County
- Municipality: Falköping Municipality
- Time zone: UTC+1 (CET)
  - Summer (DST): UTC+2 (CEST)

Luttra is a locality situated in Falköping Municipality, Västra Götaland County, Sweden.

== See also ==
- Luttra Woman
