= Yuxarı Çaykənd =

- Municipality
- Location within Azerbaijan
- Coordinates: 40°38′50″N 45°59′39″E
- Country: Azerbaijan
- Rayon: Shamkir

Population
  - Total: 226
- Time zone: UTC+4 (AZT)
  - Summer (DST): UTC+5 (AZT)

Yuxarı Çaykənd (before 1991 Barum) is a village and municipality in the Shamkir Rayon of Azerbaijan. It has a population of 225.
