= Wilhelm Holmqvist =

Swedish archaeologist (1905–1989)

- Born: Wilhelm Holmqvist; 6 April 1905; Ljusdal, Sweden
- Died: 9 August 1989 (aged 84); Sweden
- Occupations: Archaeologist, art historian, scholar

Wilhelm Egon Holmqvist (6 April 1905 – 9 August 1989) was a Swedish archaeologist, art historian and scholar. He published extensively, and among other work led excavations at Helgö.

== Early life and education ==
Wilhelm Holmqvist was born on 6 April 1905 in Ljusdal, Sweden. Through the scholarship of a family friend he attended both secondary school and Stockholm University. At university he studied Nordic archaeology with Nils Åberg (sv), whose typological-chronological approach Holmqvist adapted. After receiving his bachelor's degree in 1932, he received scholarships from the Alexander von Humboldt Foundation and the German Academic Exchange Service to spend several years studying in Germany, particularly in Berlin and Frankfurt. On the basis of this study he submitted his dissertation, Kunstprobleme der Merowingerzeit ("Art problems of the Merovingian period"), for graduation on 2 December 1939. The work eventually attracted much attention, but only after being largely forgotten during the ensuing World War II period.

== Career ==
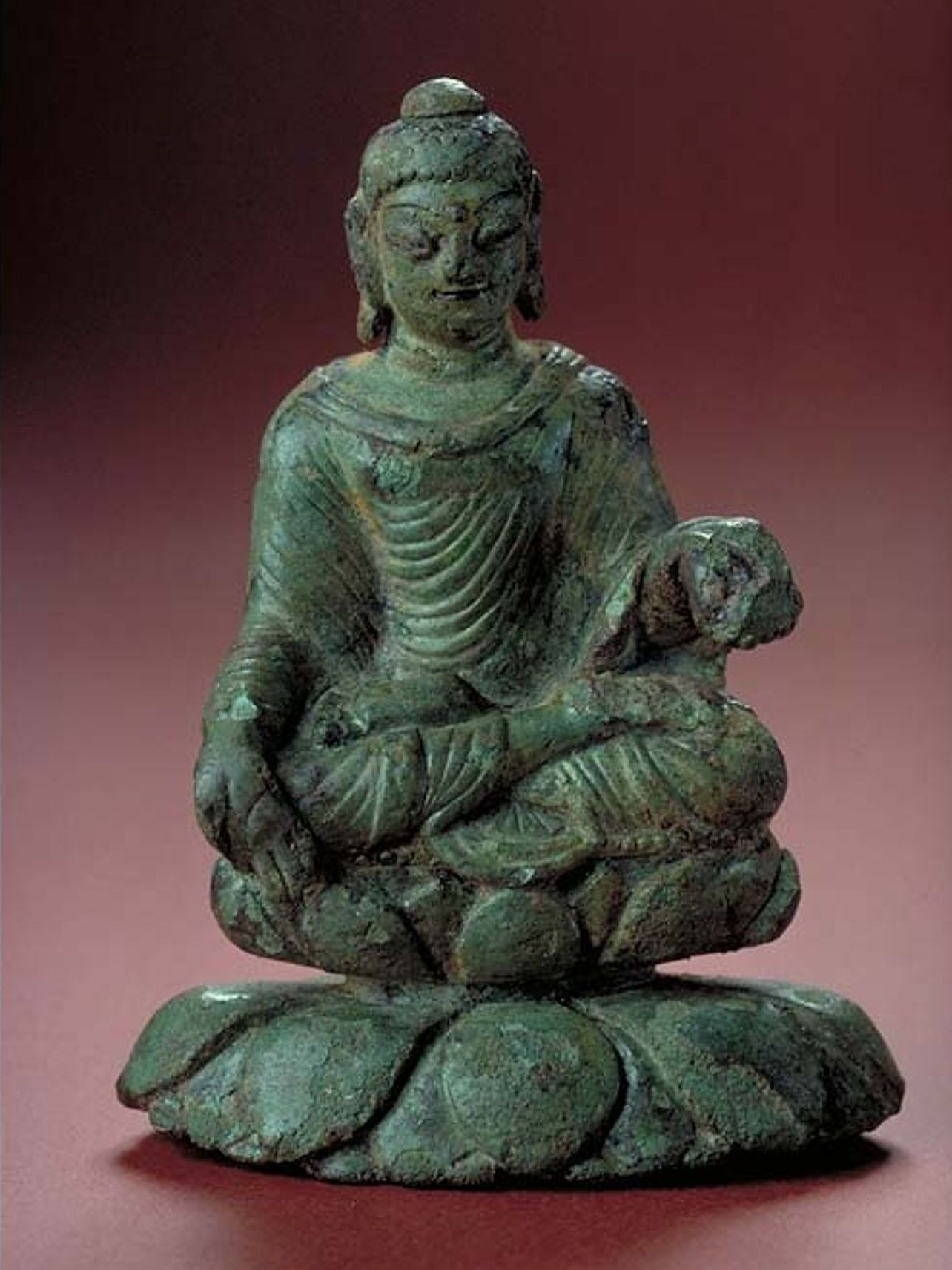
The Helgö Buddha

Holmqvist worked as a lecturer at Stockholm University from 1940 to 1956. In 1953, he also became the director of the Iron Age Department at the Statens historiska museum, holding the position until 1971. This role ensured that antiquities constantly passed through his hands, influencing his scholarship and leading to several of his publications.

A 'turning point' in Holmqvist's career came in 1954, when he discovered a major prehistoric archaeological site on the Swedish island of Helgö. The finds, which early on included a bronze 6th-century Buddha statuette from North India, an Irish crosier, and a Coptic ladle, led to two decades of excavations. These were partially funded through the intervention of King Gustaf VI Adolf, who on 15 June 1965 bestowed upon Holmqvist the title of professor. Holmqvist led the excavations, which included work by his students and archaeologists such as Valdemars Ginters (lv), until his retirement on 1 January 1975.

== Personal life ==
Holmqvist died on 9 August 1989 at the age of 84.

== Publications ==
For a list of publications through 1974, see Lamm 1975.

- Holmqvist, Wilhelm (1960). "The Dancing Gods". Acta Archaeologica. XXXI (2–3): 101–127. ISSN 0065-101X.
- Holmqvist, Wilhelm (1975). "Helgö, an early trading settlement in central Sweden". In Bruce-Mitford, Rupert (ed.). Recent Archaeological Excavations in Europe. London: Routledge & Kegan Paul. pp. 111–132. ISBN 0-7100-7963-X.

== Bibliography ==
- "Dr. phil. Wilhelm Holmqvist". Bayerische Akademie der Wissenschaften. 29 July 2009. Archived from the original on 5 January 2022.
- Lamm, Jan Peder (1975). The Published Writings of Wilhelm Holmqvist: 1934–1974. Stockholm: Unidentified. ISBN 91-7192-243-1.
- Lundström, Agneta (July–August 1978). "Helgo: A Pre-Viking Trading Center". Archaeology. 31 (4). Archaeological Institute of America: 24–31. JSTOR 41726230.
- Lundström, Per & Lamm, Jan Peder (1990). "Wilhelm Holmqvist in Memoriam" (PDF). Fornvännen (in Swedish). 85: 183–185. ISSN 0015-7813.
- Stjernquist, Berta (1994). "Wilhelm Holmqvist—the Helgö scholar". In Clarke, Helen (ed.). Excavations at Helgö. Vol. XII. Stockholm: Kungliga Vitterhets Historie och Antikvitets Akademien. pp. 9–15. ISBN 91-7402-237-7.
- Werner, Joachim (1990). "Wilhelm Holmqvist: 6.4.1904 – 9.8.1989" (PDF). Jahrbuch der Bayerischen Akademie der Wissenschaften (in German): 248–250. ISSN 0084-6090.
