= Buddhism in Sweden =

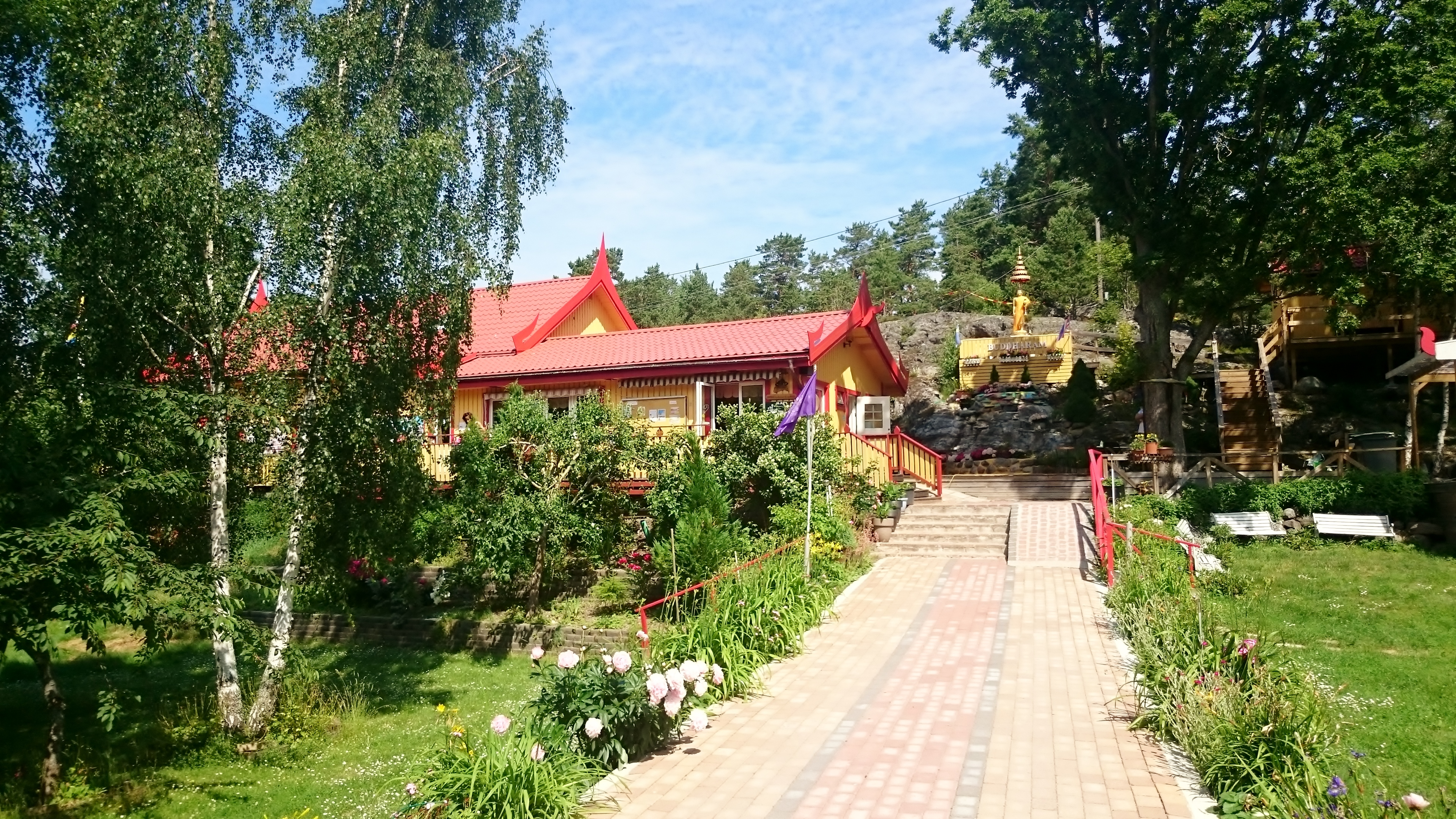
Buddharama Temple in Torsby, Värmdö Municipality

Buddhism is a relatively small religion in Sweden. In April 2020, the number of Buddhists was estimated in to be around 57,000 people, around 0.7% of Sweden's population, making it Sweden's third largest religion after Christianity and Islam.

Many practicing Buddhists in Sweden have Asian (mostly Thai, Chinese and Vietnamese) heritage.

== History ==
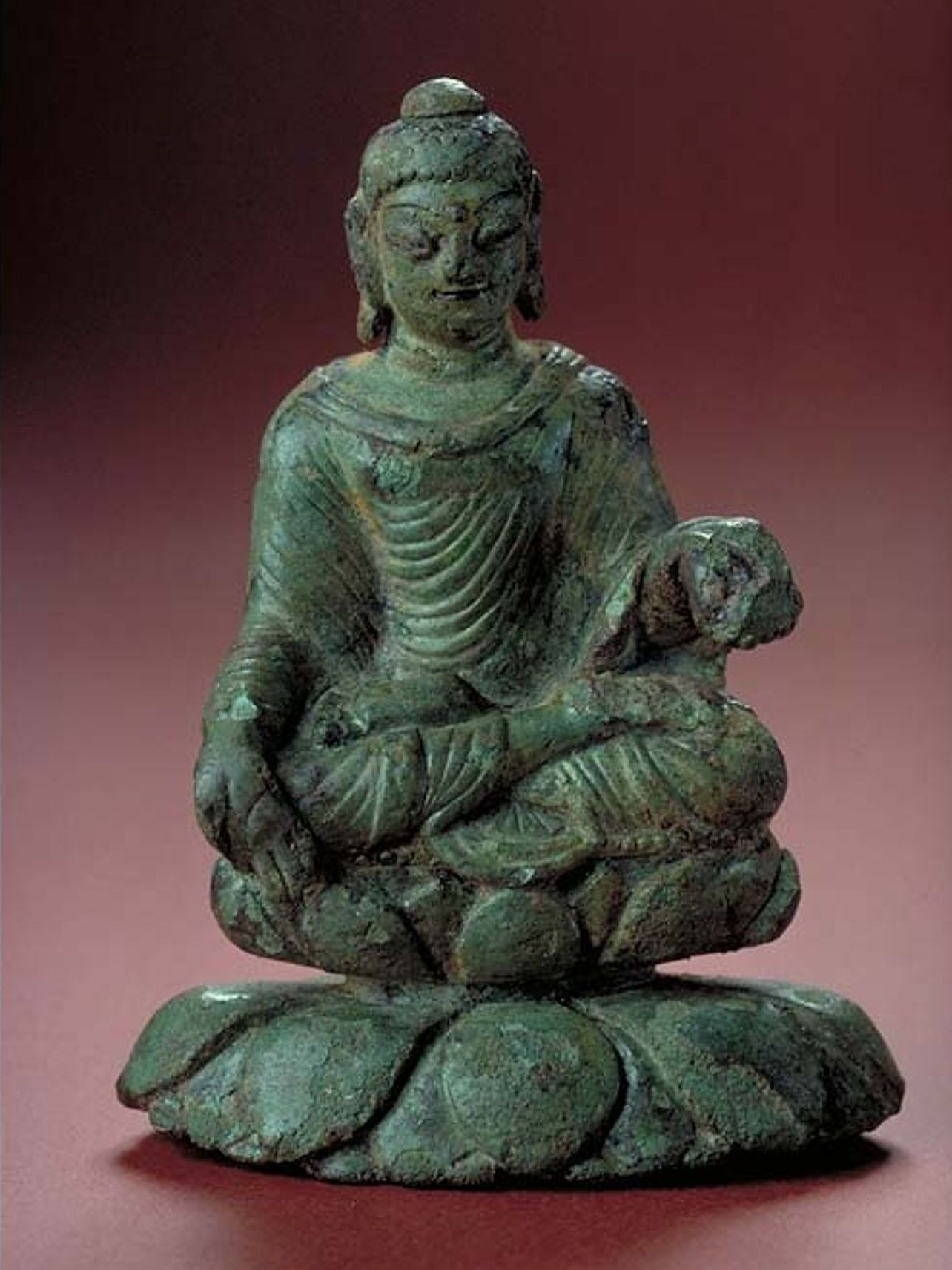
The Helgö Buddha

Evidence of Buddhism in Sweden dates back to the Viking era. A 6th century Buddha statue made of bronze and presumed to have been made in Kashmir was found at Helgö in Sweden.

One of the first texts in Swedish concerning Buddhism was Victor Pfeiff's translation of Edwin Arnold's Light of Asia, published in 1888 with the title Asiens ljus. The book is a story in verse about the life and teachings of Gautama Buddha. The Swedish edition contained an introduction by Viktor Rydberg.

Among the first in Sweden who developed an interest in Buddhism were August Strindberg, Dan Andersson, Karin Boye, Harry Martinson and Kata Dahlström.

== Buddhism in Sweden today ==
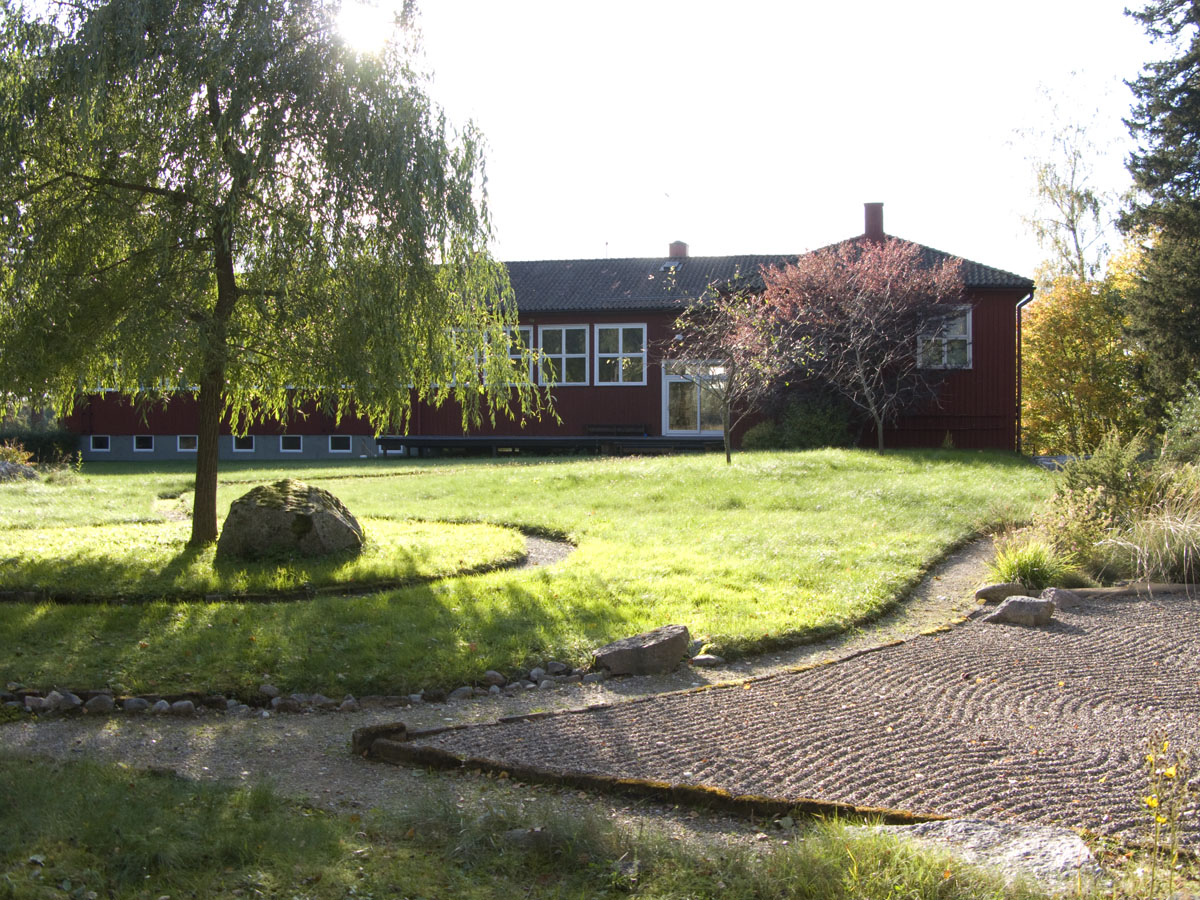
Zen temple in Sweden

The Swedish Buddhist Community is a national umbrella organisation for various Buddhist associations and congregations that are registered in Sweden. It currently has more than 25 member organisations.
