= Birgit Arrhenius =

Swedish archaeologist and academic (1932–2023)

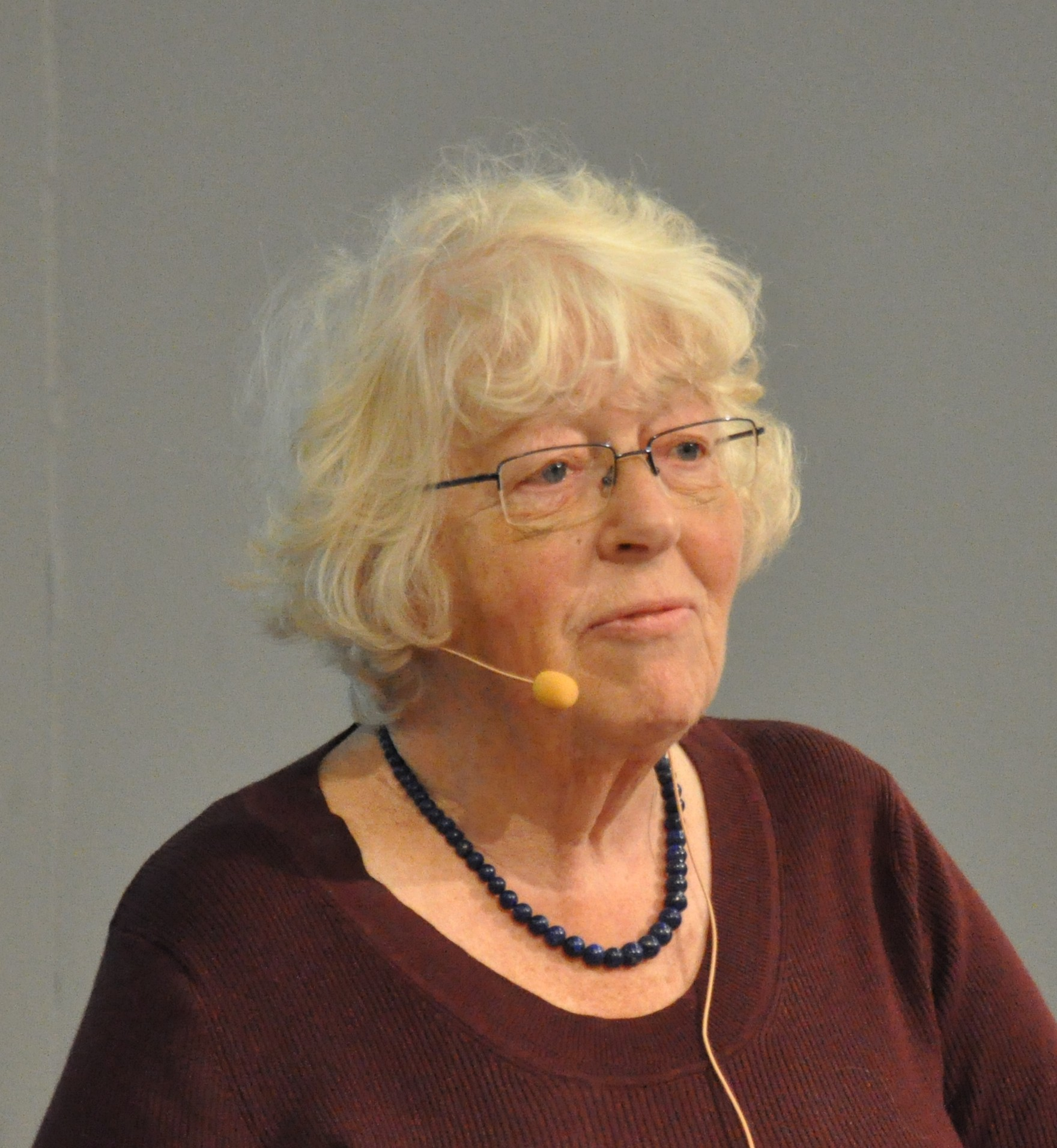
- Arrhenius in 2011
- Born: Klein; 25 August 1932
- Died: 10 September 2023 (aged 91)
- Known for: Member of the Royal Swedish Academy of Sciences
- Awards: Royal Patriotic Society's Gösta Berg Medal
- Scientific career
- Fields: Archaeology
- Institutions: Stockholm University

Birgit Arrhenius (née Klein, 25 August 1932 – 10 September 2023) was a Swedish archaeologist and professor emeritus at Stockholm University. She was a professor of laboratory archaeology, and the first head of the university's Archaeological Research Laboratory. Her work has studied places including Helgö and Mälaren, and she has researched prehistoric pressblech and garnet cloisonné work. Arrhenius is a member of the Royal Swedish Academy of Sciences, and was in 1992 the recipient of the Royal Patriotic Society's Gösta Berg Medal.

== Career ==
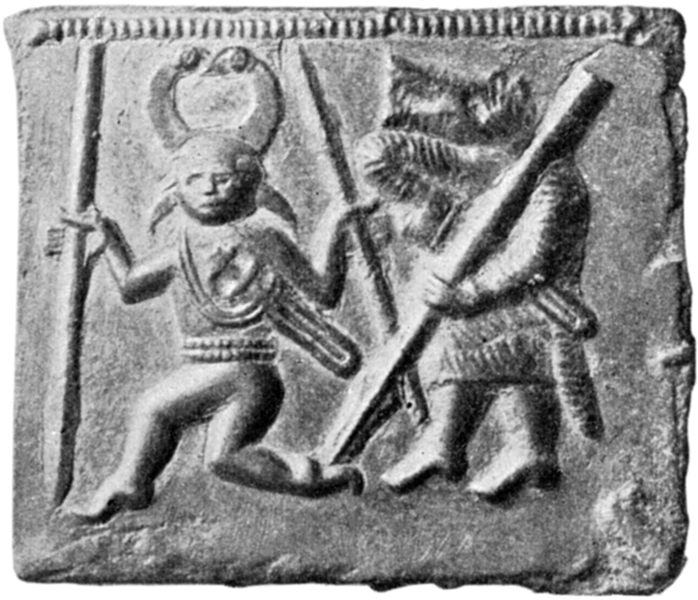
One of the four Torslunda plates, showing a horned figure. His missing right eye, shown by Arrhenius to have been struck out, suggests that he is Odin.

Birgit Arrhenius was born Birgit Klein on 25 August 1932. She was one of six children of Gerda Klein and her husband Oskar Klein, a Swedish theoretical physicist who taught at Stockholm University. Expenses were tight, and her father nearly turned down the award of the Order of the Polar Star until the dean provided for the significant cost of dressing for such an award's ceremony.

Arrhenius, like her father, became a professor at Stockholm University. She served from 1986 to 1998 as Professor of Laboratory Archaeology, and was the first head of the Archaeological Research Laboratory, founded in 1976, at the university. She participated in the excavation and publication of finds from archaeological sites at Helgö and Björkö. A 1983 paper suggested a reanalysis of the chronology of the graves found in Vendel, and in 1992 she demonstrated through laser scanning that a dancing warrior on one of the Torslunda plates, cast bronze dies used to make helmet decorations, had had its eye sharply struck out in a possible invocation of the one-eyed Germanic god Odin.

On 1 October 1991 Arrhenius was elected to the Royal Swedish Academy of Letters, History and Antiquities, and the following year she was awarded the Gösta Berg Medal, intended for those who have made "outstanding efforts" in the areas of cultural heritage, by the Royal Patriotic Society. In 1993, the journal PACT published an issue in her honour, titled Sources and Resources: Studies in Honour of Birgit Arrhenius.

Arrhenius was a professor emeritus at Stockholm University. She died on 10 September 2023, at the age of 91.

== Publications ==
A list of Arrhenius's publications through 1991 is contained in Holmqvist Olousson 1993; selected works appear below.

- Arrhenius, Birgit (1978). "Review of The Sutton Hoo Ship-Burial, volume 1, by Rupert Bruce-Mitford". Medieval Archaeology. 22. Society for Medieval Archaeology: 189–195. doi:10.1080/00766097.1978.11735412.
- Arrhenius, Birgit (1983). "The chronology of the Vendel graves". In Lamm, Jan Peder & Nordstrom, Hans-Åke (eds.). Vendel Period Studies: transactions of the Boat-Grave Symposium in Stockholm, February 2–3, 1981. Studies – The Museum of National Antiquities, Stockholm. Vol. 2. Stockholm: Statens Historiska Museum. pp. 39–70. ISBN 978-91-7192-547-3.
- Arrhenius, Birgit & Freij, Henry (1992). "'Pressbleck' Fragments from the East Mound in Old Uppsala Analyzed with a Laser Scanner" (PDF). Laborativ Arkeologi (6). Stockholm University: 75–110. Archived from the original (PDF) on 8 March 2021.

== Bibliography ==
- Arwidsson, Greta (1993). "Preface". PACT. 38. Translated by O'Meadhra, Uaininn: IX–X. ISSN 0257-8727.
- "Birgit Arrhenius". Kungl. Vitterhetsakademien. Archived from the original on 6 May 2018.
- "Birgit Arrhenius". Stockholm University. 17 May 2017. Archived from the original on 23 June 2020.
- "Gösta Berg-medaljen". Kungliga Patriotiska Sallskapet.
- "Historik – Institutionen för Arkeologi och Antikens Kultur". Stockholm University. 12 March 2015. Archived from the original on 20 March 2018.
- Holmqvist Olousson, Lena (1993). "Bibliography of Birgit Arrhenius up to 1991". PACT. 38: 561–566. ISSN 0257-8727.
- Lindström, Ulf, ed. (1995). The Oskar Klein Centenary. Singapore: World Scientific. ISBN 978-9814532549.
