= Greta Arwidsson =

Sweden's first female professor of archeology

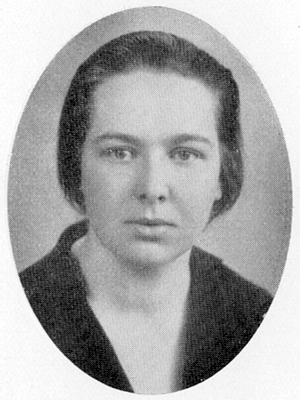
- Born: 5 July 1906; Uppsala, Sweden
- Died: 31 January 1998 (aged 91)
- Occupations: Archaeologist and academic
- Known for: Analysis of the Valsgärde graves

Academic background
- Education: Uppsala University
- Thesis: Vendelstile: Email und Glas im 7.-8. Jahrhundert (1942)
- Doctoral advisor: Sune Lindqvist

Academic work
- Discipline: Archaeology
- Sub-discipline: Scandinavian archaeology
- Institutions: Uppsala University; Jämtland Museum; Stockholm University

Greta Arwidsson (5 July 1906 – 31 January 1998) was a Swedish archaeologist. Alongside other work, she is known for her study of the Valsgärde graves, published from the 1940s until the 1970s.

== Early life and education ==
Greta Arwidsson was born on 5 July 1906, in Uppsala, Sweden. Her father's line traced to a soldier who died in the Battle of Napue in 1714; her great-grandfather, Adolf Ivar Arwidsson, was a historian and intellectual, her grandfather, Thorsten Adolf Arwidsson (sv), a cartographer and naval officer, and her father, Ivar Arwidsson (sv), a zoologist. Both parents worked at the Nordic Museum. Her mother, Anna Arwidsson (née Jacobsson), recorded oral folk tradition, and during her travels around the country collected many items for the museum's collections.

Arwidsson's parents took her to public lectures as a child, including talks by Oscar Montelius and Gabriel Gustafson about the Viking Oseberg finds. Matriculating at Uppsala University, she obtained a Master of Philosophy in 1930 with studies in Latin, geography and history, and designs of going on to teach. While studying under Sune Lindqvist she began working on the Valsgärde excavations, however, and began investigating and publishing the boat graves found therein. She obtained her Ph.D. in 1942, the same year that she published her first Valsgärde monograph, Valsgärde 6, with the dissertation Vendelstile: Email und Glas in 7.-8. Jahrhundert.

== Career ==
While still in school, from 1936 until 1941 Arwidsson periodically served as an antiquarian at the Statens Historiska Museum, first in the Stone and Bronze Age department, and then in the Iron Age department. From 1942 until 1946, she was a lecturer in Scandinavian and Comparative Archaeology at Uppsala University, working at the Jämtland Museum during the summers of 1943 and 1944.

Arwidsson became Sweden's first female professor of Scandinavian and Comparative Archaeology in 1956, when she took the post at Stockholm University. From 1958 until 1961 she also served as dean of the Faculty of Humanities and as a member of the college board. She taught in that role until 1973, when she became a professor emeritus.

In retirement Arwidsson published some of her earlier works. In 1977 she published Valsgärde 7, having previously published Valsgärde 8 in 1954, and from 1984 to 1989 edited a collection of articles on Birka, including 36 that she penned herself.

== Personal life ==
Arwidsson died on 31 January 1998, and is buried in Uppsala old cemetery. She neither married nor had children.

== Publications ==
- Arwidsson, Greta (1942a). Vendelstile: Email und Glas im 7.-8. Jahrhundert [Vendel styles: Enamel and glass in the 7th–8th century] (Ph.D.) (in German). Uppsala University. OCLC 872286610.
- Arwidsson, Greta (1932). "Some Glass Vessels from the Boar-Grave Cemetery at Valsgärde". Acta Archaeologica. III: 251–266. ISSN 0065-101X.
- Arwidsson, Greta (1934). "A New Scandinavian Form of Helmet from the Vendel-Time". Acta Archaeologica. V: 243–257. ISSN 0065-101X.
- Arwidsson, Greta (1942b). Valsgärde 6. Die Gräberfunde von Valsgärde (in German). Vol. I. Uppsala: Almqvist & Wiksells Boktryckeri A.B.
- Arwidsson, Greta (1954). Valsgärde 8. Die Gräberfunde von Valsgärde (in German). Vol. II. Uppsala: Almqvist & Wiksells Boktryckeri A.B.
- Arwidsson, Greta (1977). Valsgärde 7. Die Gräberfunde von Valsgärde (in German). Vol. III. Uppsala: Uppsala universitets museum för nordiska fornsaker. ISBN 91-506-0113-X.
- Arwidsson, Greta (1983). "Valsgärde". In Lamm, Jan Peder & Nordstrom, Hans-Åke (eds.). Vendel Period Studies: transactions of the Boat-Grave Symposium in Stockholm, February 2–3, 1981. Studies – The Museum of National Antiquities, Stockholm. Vol. 2. Stockholm: Statens Historiska Museum. pp. 71–82. ISBN 978-91-7192-547-3.
- Arwidsson, Greta (1993). "Preface". PACT. 38. Translated by O'Meadhra, Uaininn: IX–X. ISSN 0257-8727.

== Bibliography ==
- Arrhenius, Birgit. "Greta Arwidsson, 1906-07-05 — 1998-01-31: Arkeolog, Landsantikvarie, Professor". Svenskt kvinnobiografiskt lexikon. Translated by Grosjean, Alexia.
- Berg, Gösta & Lamm, Jan Peder (1991). "Greta Arwidsson 85 år" (PDF). Fornvännen (in Swedish). 86: 91–97. ISSN 0015-7813. Archived from the original (PDF) on 16 April 2018.
- "Greta Arwidsson (1906–1998)". National Archives of Sweden. Archived from the original on 16 April 2018. (in Swedish)
- "Greta Arwidsson: 1906–1998". Statens Historiska Museum. (in Swedish)
- Grönwall, Linda (2002). "Greta Arwidssons Arkeologiska Kvarlåtenskap vid Institutionen i Stockholm" (PDF). Fornvännen (in Swedish). 97 (4): 281–287. ISSN 0015-7813. Archived from the original (PDF) on 5 May 2018.
