= David M. Wilson =

British archaeologist, art historian, and museum curator (b. 1931)

David Wilson FBA
- Born: 30 October 1931 (age 94); Dacre Banks, England
- Education: Kingswood School
- Alma mater: St John's College, Cambridge; University of Lund
- Occupations: Art historian and museum director

Sir David Mackenzie Wilson (born 30 October 1931) is a British archaeologist, art historian, and museum curator, specialising in Anglo-Saxon art and the Viking Age. From 1977 until 1992 he served as the director of the British Museum, where he had previously worked, from 1955 to 1964, as an assistant keeper. In his role as director of the museum, he became embroiled in the controversy over the ownership of the Elgin Marbles with the Greek government, engaging with a "disastrous" televised debate with Greek Minister of Culture Melina Mercouri.

== Education ==
Wilson was born on 30 October 1931 in Dacre Banks, near Harrogate, England. He was the son of Joseph Wilson, a minister, and Nora, a lecturer. From 1941 to 1950, Wilson was educated at Kingswood School, a boarding independent school for boys (now co-educational) in Bath, followed by St John's College, Cambridge, from where he obtained a Master of Arts. In 1955 he obtained a graduate degree from the Lund University in Sweden.

== Life and career ==
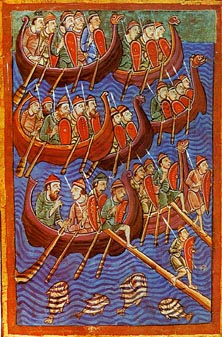
Sea-faring Danes depicted during their invasions of England

From 1977 to 1992 Wilson served as the director of the British Museum, where he was the seventeenth person to hold that distinction since its 1753 founding. He had previously worked there from 1955 to 1964 as an assistant keeper, after which he worked at the University of London. There he was reader from 1964 to 1971, and a professor of medieval archaeology from 1971 to 1976; from 1973 he was also the joint head of the department of Scandinavian studies at University College London.

During his time as director, from 1985 to 1986 Wilson was Slade Professor of Fine Art at the University of Cambridge. He was a member of the Ancient Monuments Board for England from 1976 to 1984, the Nottingham University Council from 1988 to 1984, and the Historic Buildings and Monuments Commission from 1990 to 1998. From 1976 to 1981 he was a member of the board of governors for the Museum of London; he was also a trustee, of the National Museums of Scotland from 1985 to 1987, and of the National Museums of Merseyside from 1986 to 2001.

Wilson has written extensively on the subject of the Anglo-Saxons and Vikings, as well as the British Museum itself. In 1960 he published The Anglo-Saxons, and in 1970 was praised for The Viking Achievement, written with Peter Foote and focused on the daily life, social customs, religion, art, trade, law, and poetry of Scandinavian society from 800 to 1200 AD. He also published Viking Art in 1966, The Vikings and Their Origins in 1970, and Anglo-Saxon Art: From the Seventh Century to the Norman Conquest in 1984.

=== 1983 television debate with Melina Mercouri ===
In his role as director of the British Museum, Wilson had a televised debate in 1983 with Greek actress and Minister of Culture Melina Mercouri. This was widely seen as a public relations disaster for the British Museum. The Parthenon Marbles had been removed from the Parthenon by agents of Lord Elgin after ostensibly obtaining permission from the Ottoman Sultan. The debate had been cited a defining moment for the campaign for restitution of the marbles to Athens.

=== Awards and honours ===
Wilson has received many awards and honours throughout his professional life. In 1977 he received the Order of the Polar Star, a Swedish order of chivalry. The following year the University of Gothenburg honoured him with the Félix Neubergh Prize, and in the 1984 New Year Honours, he was knighted. The Society of Antiquaries of London awarded Wilson a gold medal in 1992.

Wilson has also received a number of honorary degrees. The Stockholm University awarded him with a Fil.Dr., and he received a D.Phil. from each of the University of Aarhus and the University of Oslo. In addition, the University of Liverpool, University of Birmingham, University of Nottingham, and University of Leicester each gave him a D.Litt., and the University of Pennsylvania an L.L.D.

=== Memberships ===
Throughout his career, Wilson has maintained many professional memberships, and roles within organisations. From 1957 to 1977, he served as the secretary for the Society for Medieval Archaeology, and from 1962 until 1968 he was the president of the British Archaeological Association; he was also the president of the Viking Society from 1968 until 1970. He is also a fellow of the British Academy and the Society of Antiquaries of London. Additionally, Wilson is a member of the Royal Irish Academy, the Royal Swedish Academy of Science, the Royal Swedish Academy of Letters, History and Antiquities, the Norwegian Academy of Science and Letters, the German Archaeological Institute, the Royal Gustavus Adolphus Academy in Sweden, the Royal Society of Letters of Lund, the Society of Sciences in Lund (1972), the Royal Society of Sciences and Letters in Gothenburg, the Royal Society of Sciences in Uppsala, and the Royal Norwegian Society of Science and Letters, and is an honorary member of the Polish Archaeological and Numismatic Society.

== Personal life ==
Wilson lives on the Isle of Man. He married Eva Sjoegren, an author and artist, in 1955, and has two children, Simon and Kate.

== Publications ==
Additional publications are listed here

- 1964. Anglo-Saxon Ornamental Metalwork 700–1100, in the British Museum, British Museum Press.
- 1970. The Vikings and their Origins: Scandinavia in the first millennium, Thames and Hudson.
- Wilson, David M. (1980). The Northern World: The History and Heritage of Northern Europe AD 400—1100. London: Thames and Hudson, Ltd. ISBN 978-0-500-25070-9. (US edition: Harry N. Abrams, Inc, Publishers, 1980.)
- Wilson, David M. (1983). "Sweden – England". In Lamm, Jan Peder & Nordstrom, Hans-Åke (eds.). Vendel Period Studies: transactions of the Boat-Grave Symposium in Stockholm, February 2–3, 1981. Studies – The Museum of National Antiquities, Stockholm. Vol. 2. Stockholm: Statens Historiska Museum. pp. 163–166. ISBN 978-91-7192-547-3.
- Wilson, David M. (1984). Anglo-Saxon Art: From the Seventh Century to the Norman Conquest. London: Thames and Hudson. (US edition: Overlook Press)
- Wilson, David M. (1986). "England and the Continent in the Eighth Century – An Archaeological Viewpoint". Angli e Sassoni al di qua e al di là del mare: 26 aprile-lo maggio 1984. Settimane di studio del Centro italiano di studi sull'alto Medioevo. Vol. XXXII. Spoleto: Centro italiano di studi sull'alto Medioevo. pp. 219–244.
- 1992. Anglo-Saxon Paganism, Routledge.
- Wilson, David M. (2002). The British Museum: A History. London: British Museum Press. ISBN 0-7141-2764-7.

=== Reviews ===
- Wilson, David M. (1 November 1974). "Excavating East Anglia". Medieval History. The Times Literary Supplement. No. 3, 791. London. p. 1233. Archived from the original on 30 July 2021.

== See also ==
- List of directors of the British Museum

== Bibliography ==
- "David Mackenzie Wilson". Contemporary Authors Online. Gale Cengage. 16 March 2007.
- "Sir David Mackenzie Wilson". Marquis Who's Who. Gale Cengage.
