= Björn Ambrosiani =

Swedish archaeologist and civil servant (born 1928)

- Born: March 8, 1928 (age 97)
- Occupations: Archaeologist and former civil servant
- Known for: Worked at the Swedish History Museum and the Swedish National Heritage Board
- Notable work: Excavations at Henriksdalsberget

Björn Ambrosiani (born 8 March 1928) is a Swedish archaeologist and former civil servant. He worked at the Swedish History Museum and the Swedish National Heritage Board, as a research director among other positions.

Ambrosiani led a number of excavations at different sites. In the 1960s he led the excavations at Henriksdalsberget, and from 1969–71 and again from 1990–95 he was responsible for excavations of the Viking-age trading center Birka. The first project was the first at Birka since that led by Hjalmar Stolpe in the 1870s.

== Early life and education ==
Björn Ambrosiani was born on 8 March 1928. In 1947, before matriculating at university, he spent two months working under Gunnar Ekelund as an archaeological field surveyor in Östergötland. The experience inspired him to study archaeology, in addition to history, when he subsequently enrolled in Uppsala University. While at Uppsala he helped with seminar excavations at Valsgärde, and, as an assistant at the university's Institution of Archaeology, excavated in Darsgärde (sv) before the area's exploitation.

== Career ==
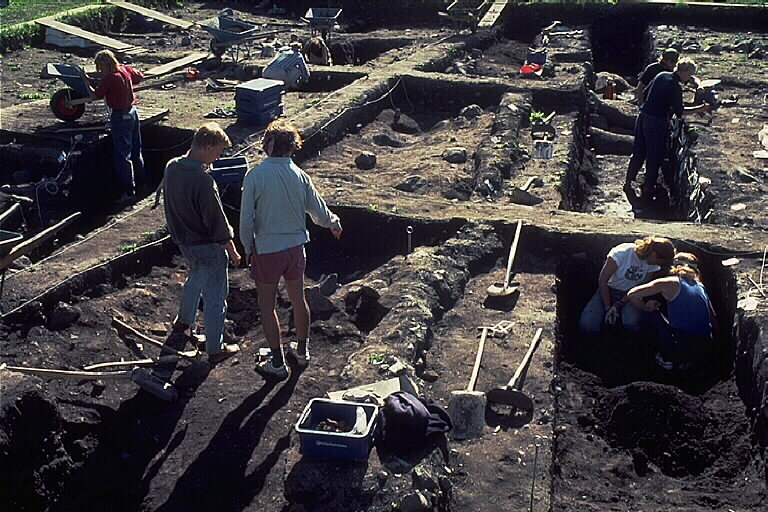
Photograph by Ambrosiani of excavations at Birka in 1991

When Ambrosiani graduated in 1952, he began work with the Riksantikvarieämbetet (Swedish National Heritage Board), including a stint at the Statens historiska museum. His work included both administrative work in Stockholm, and excavations in northern Sweden prior to the installation of hydropower projects. In 1955, he received his licentiate degree, writing on women’s jewelry from the late Vendel Period. The next year he returned to Darsgärde, and following that, he led excavations in southern Sweden on behalf of the Riksantikvarieämbetet's Department of Ancient Monuments. This resulted in the formation of a new department, known as UV (for UppdragsVerksamheten or UndersökningsVerksamheten, literally "mission operations" or "survey operations"), which Ambrosiani described as "a new department that carried out development led, commissioned archaeological excavations." Ambrosiani soon became the head of the Excavation Departement at the Swedish National Heritage Board, filling the role from 1959 until 1974.

Ambrosiani received his Pd.D. in 1964, with the dissertation Fornlämningar och Bebyggelse (Ancient Monuments and Settlement). It was termed one of the most innovative of the twentieth century. The field of academic archaeology was still relatively new in Sweden; only a few decades earlier, wrote Ambrosiani, students defending their dissertations were "occasions which the whole of Sweden’s archaeological world turned out to witness." Six years later, in 1970, he was appointed an associate professor at Stockholm University. From 1975 until 1987 he was the head of the Museum Department, and head of research, at Statens historiska museer. Starting in 1990 and through 1995, Ambrosiani was also the project manager for the excavations at Birka, a Viking Age trading center.

Ambrosiani received the Monteliusmedaljen (sv) (the Oscar Montelius medal) in 2004.

== Publications ==
- Fornlämningar och bebyggelse. Studier i Attundalands och Södertörns förhistoria (1964).
- Ambrosiani, Björn (1983). "Regalia and symbols in the boat-graves". In Lamm, Jan Peder & Nordstrom, Hans-Åke (eds.). Vendel Period Studies: transactions of the Boat-Grave Symposium in Stockholm, February 2–3, 1981. Studies – The Museum of National Antiquities, Stockholm. Vol. 2. Stockholm: Statens Historiska Museum. pp. 23–30. ISBN 978-91-7192-547-3.
- Birka vikingastaden. Vol. 1, [Jakten på Svarta jordens hemligheter har börjat!] (1991)
- Birka vikingastaden. Vol. 2, [Sensationella fynd i Stolpes schakt] : [unika gjutformar från vikingatidens verkstäder!] (1992)
- Birka vikingastaden. Vol. 3, [Askan i svarta jorden avslöjar: de första husen!] (1993)
- Birka vikingastaden. Vol. 4, [Smycken och djurben bland 40000 fynd – vattensållet avslöjar livet för 1200 år sedan] (1994)
- Birka vikingastaden. Vol. 5, [Vikingastaden lever upp igen i TV:s modell av 800-talets Birka] (1995)
- Clarke, Helen & Ambrosiani, Björn, Towns in the Viking Age (London: Leicester University Press, 1991; revised edition 1995)
  - Swedish edition: Vikingastäder (Höganäs: Wiken, 1993)
  - Japanese edition: ”Vaikingu to tosi” (Tokyo: Tokai University Press, 2001)

== Bibliography ==
- "Ambrosiani, Björn, 1928–". Libris katalogisering (in Swedish). 28 March 2018.
- "Björn Ambrosiani – Uppslagsverk – NE". www.ne.se (in Swedish).
- Ambrosiani, Björn (2012). "Swedish Contract Archaeology in the 1950s and 1960s". In Jensen, Ola Wolfheckel (ed.). Histories of Archaeological Practices: Reflections on Methods, Strategies and Social Organisation in Past Fieldwork. Studies. Stockholm: Statens Historiska Museum. pp. 305–324. ISBN 978-91-89176-47-8.
- Svanberg, Jan (25 March 2013). "2004 Professor Björn Ambrosiani". Svenska Fornminnesföreningen (in Swedish).
