= Kaggeholms gård =

Manor at Ekerö Municipality, Stockholm County, Sweden

- Smaller locality
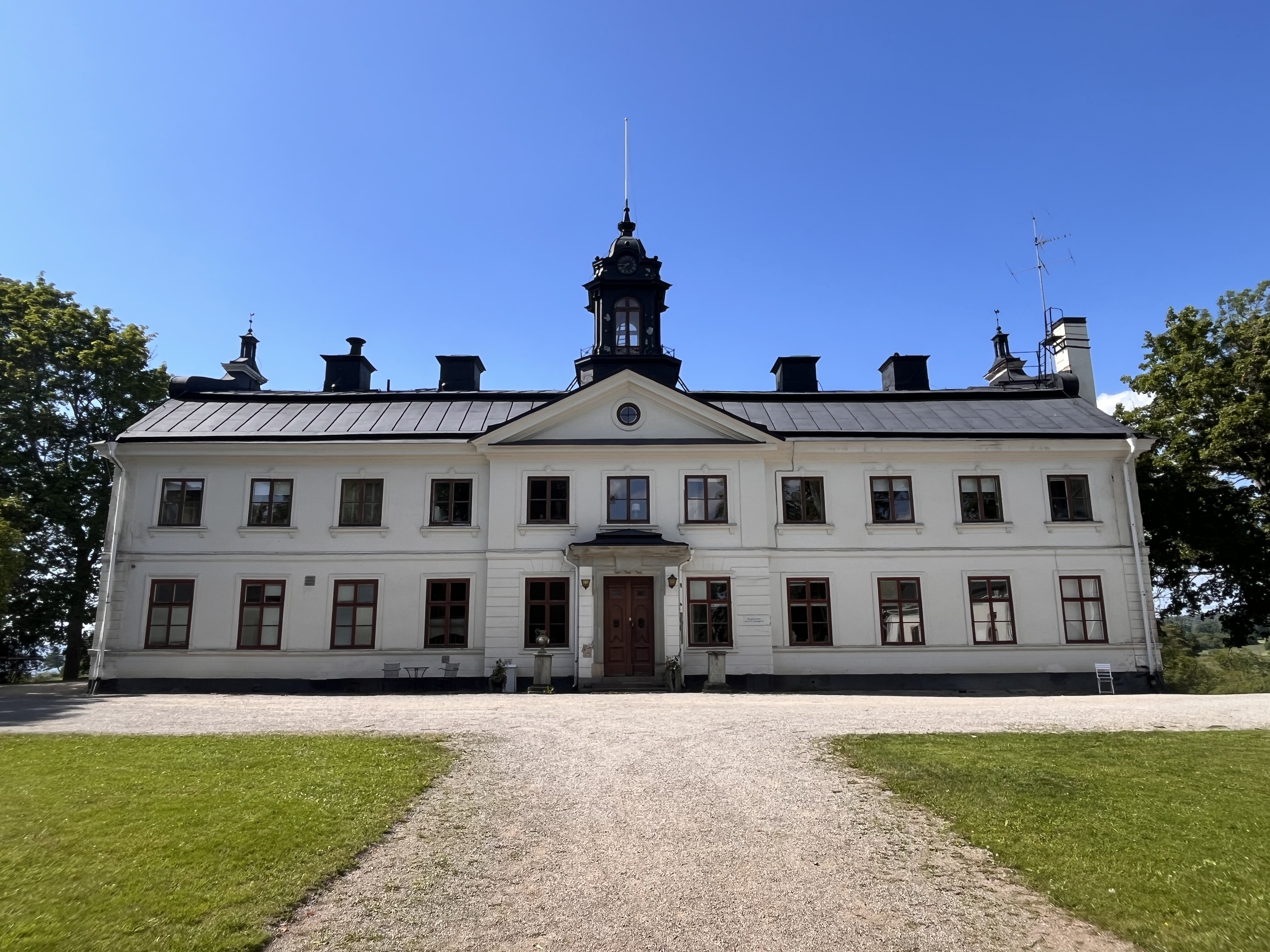
- Interactive map of Kaggeholms gård
- Coordinates: 59°16′58″N 17°39′49″E
- Country: Sweden
- County: Stockholm County
- Municipality: Ekerö Municipality
- Time zone: UTC+1 (CET)
  - Summer (DST): UTC+2 (CEST)

Kaggeholms gård is a manor in Ekerö Municipality, Stockholm County, Sweden.

== History ==
The site was first mentioned in a land title document from 1287. During the 1500s, the farm was owned by members of the Grip and Bååt families.

In 1647, Count Lars Kagg (1595–1661) acquired an estate on the island of Helgö situated in Lake Mälaren which he named Kaggeholm. In the 1720s, construction of the manor house began after drawings by Baroque architect Nicodemus Tessin the Younger (1654–1728). The chateau-style Kaggeholm Castle (Kaggeholms slott) received its present appearance in the middle of the 19th century when a number of major changes took place.

Today Kaggeholm operates as a conference center managed by the Swedish property development company Sisyfosgruppen Holding. It had previously been used by the Swedish Pentecostal Movement as a training center for Kaggeholm College (Kaggeholms folkhögskola).

== In popular culture ==
The castle served as the setting of the fictional boarding school Hillerska in Netflix's series Young Royals.
