= Bombardment of Bohus Fortress =

Part of the Torstenson War

- Part of the Torstenson War
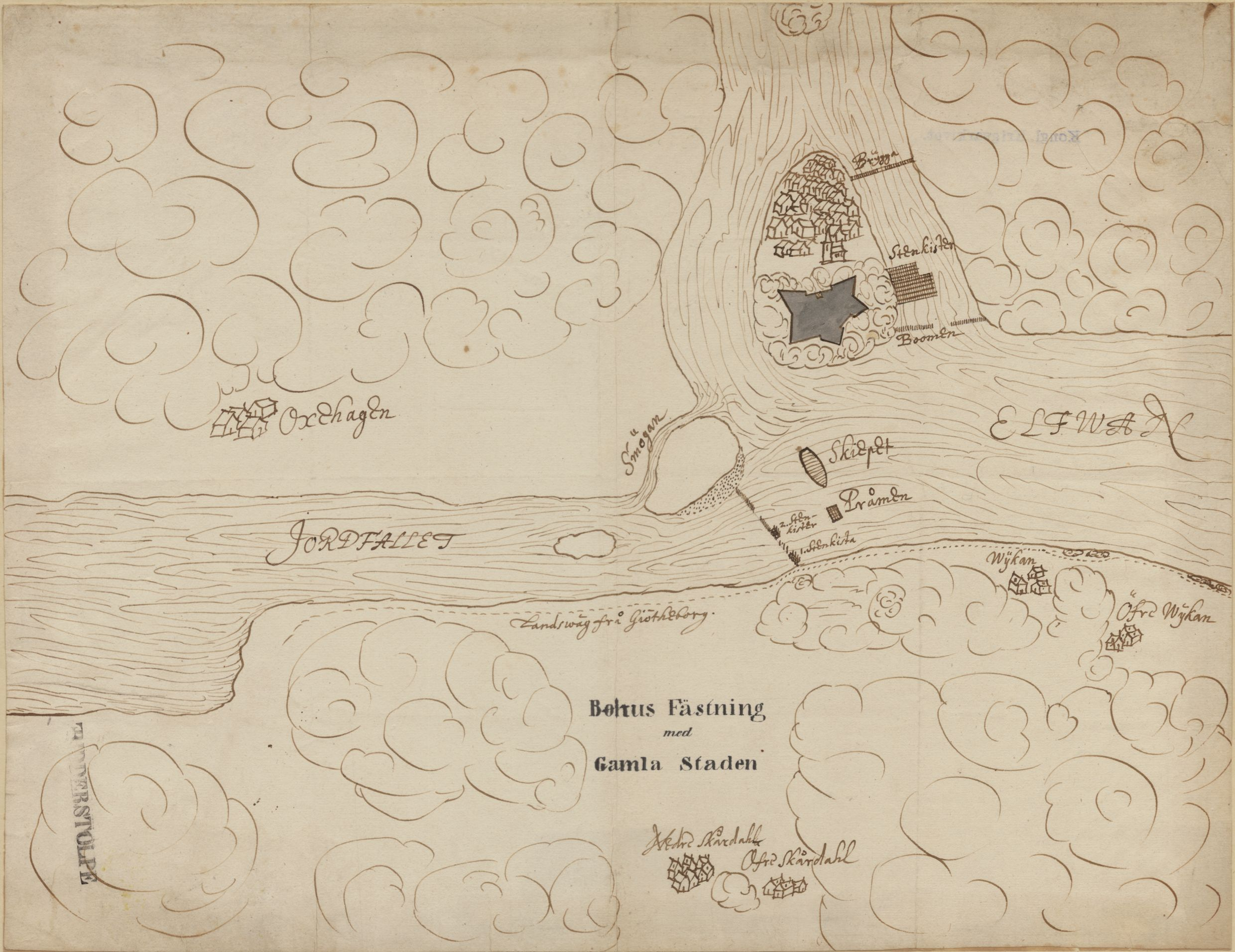
- Contemporary map of Bohus fortress and its defenses by Johan Wärnschiöldh
Date	13–18 August 1645
Location	Bohus Fortress, Denmark–Norway (present-day Sweden) 57°51′42″N 11°59′58″E
Result	Inconclusive

Belligerents
(yes) Swedish Empire	Denmark–Norway

Commanders and leaders
(yes) Lars Kagg (yes) Alexander Hamilton (WIA)	Henrik Bielke; Ziegler

Units involved
(yes) Västmanland Regiment	Bohus garrison

Strength
c. 900 men (Note: By the end of hostilities); Several guns One boat	c. 300–500 men At least three vessels

Casualties and losses
Unknown	At least 30 killed and wounded

The bombardment of Bohus Fortress (Note: Swedish: beskjutningen av Bohus fästning; Danish: Båhus fæstnings bombardement. Also referred to as a siege.) occurred from 13 to 18 August 1645 during the Torstenson War between Denmark–Norway and Sweden.

Following Hannibal Sehested's departure from Bohus fortress on 13 August, a Swedish army led by Lars Kagg approached the fortress on the same day. The Swedes initially captured a redoubt at Fiskerholm, though they were repelled by Norwegian barges on the river soon after.

At the same time, the Swedes built several artillery batteries on the Färjestad heights, using these to bombard Kungälv. Instead of helping the inhabitants of the town, the Bohus garrison plundered Kungälv and believed Kungälv's destruction would aid in the defense of Bohus.

On 15 August, the Swedes attempted to burn six Norwegian ships. While the initial plan failed, as these ships sailed away, they instead attacked a ship from Hamburg. They seized the belongings of several inhabitants of Kungälv and thousands of rigsdaler, before abandoning and burning the ship following a Norwegian counterattack.

On 16 August, a 24-hour ceasefire was called, followed by a 48-hour ceasefire on 18 August. Two days later, Kagg received news of the Treaty of Brömsebro and withdrew from the fortress in mid-September.

== Background ==
On 13 December 1643, after months of preparation by Axel Oxenstierna, a Swedish army of 16,000 men invaded Holstein under the command of Lennart Torstensson. The invasion sparked the eponymous Torstenson War between Denmark and Sweden.

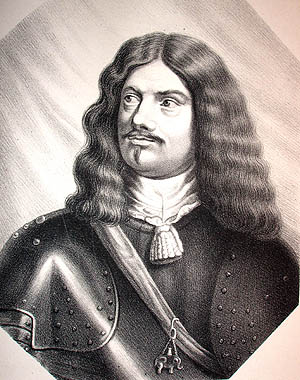
Portrait of Hannibal Sehested by Jens Peter Trap

After the defeat at Ranängen in early August 1645, Hannibal Sehested ordered three frigates and three galleys to Nordre älv to prevent crossings by Swedish forces. On 11 August, on the request of Lars Kagg, Swedish cavalry captain Erik Uggla was released from Bohus fortress. He had been held prisoner in the fortress for four days. In return, Kagg released a Norwegian trumpeter.

The following day, both sides exchanged more prisoners. During the exchange, Kagg expressed confusion over Sehested having undertaken a new incursion into Sweden despite the approaching peace, noting that he had been ordered by Queen Christina to avoid offensive operations.

In response, Sehested said that he had not received an equivalent order. He was also confronted by Kagg for having burned down a hospital, which Sehested said was a part of his way of conducting war. Kagg now intended to "stand by the sword" until he received explicit orders to cease all hostilities. The following day, the Swedes resumed operations with the goal of capturing Bohus.

== Prelude ==
To defend Bohuslän from the Swedes, Sehested dispersed his troops. At Sjöhed, 200 men were stationed under the command of Gray, along with a half-squadron of dragoons under Gersdorf. At Hjärtum, he stationed Taylor's regiment, Major Blume's squadron, 200 dragoons under Major Edward, and some 250 cavalry under Lieutenant Colonel Willumsen. Additionally, men from Bohus' garrison were stationed in two redoubts by the nearby stone dam and farmstead.

Bohus fortress itself had a garrison of some 300–500 (Note: The exact size of the garrison is disputed. Swedish historian Vilhelm Vessberg estimated it at 300 men, while Norwegian historian Carl Oscar Munthe estimated it at around 500 men.) men under Lieutenant Colonel Ziegler, with Henrik Bielke holding overall command. The garrison consisted of the Bohus Regiment, Akershus Regiment, Ziegler's company, Hagen Børgensen's company, and Lieutenant Johan Worms' company.

On 13 August, Sehested and his wife left Bohus and went to Marstrand. At Sjöhed, Kagg gathered rafts to cross the Göta älv onto Inland, and a ship bridge was laid down at Ellebo so that he could maintain communication with Västergötland.

== Bombardment ==
Portrait of Lars Kagg by Georg Günther Kräill

On 13 August, at 14:00, the Swedes captured the Norwegian redoubt on Fiskerholm. According to Kagg, the only Swedish casualty was Alexander Hamilton from the Västmanland Regiment, who was wounded by a partisan spear. The Swedes initially tried to take the guns from the redoubt, but were repelled by Norwegian ships and barges in the river.

On the same day, the Swedes occupied the Färjestad heights, situated above the ferry site they had used from 6 to 7 August during the Battle of Ranängen. There, they constructed several artillery batteries, which they used to bombard Kungälv the following morning. One of the batteries consisted of four mortars and two guns.

According to Swedish historian Vilhelm Vessberg and others, the bombardment initially caused little damage, while Norwegian historian Carl Oscar Munthe stated the town quickly caught fire. The Bohus garrison did not help the inhabitants, as they believed the destruction of the town would benefit the defense of the fortress by preventing the Swedes from using its buildings as cover. The garrison plundered the town. By evening, most of Kungälv had burned down.

The Swedes were not able to set Bohus itself on fire, and Sehested urged Bielke to limit his return fire, so that the Swedes would, in his words, "waste their ammunition uselessly".

On 14 August, Kagg demanded the capitulation of Bohus and bombarded the fortress with his batteries. The bombardment continued over the following days, with the Swedes also firing on the fortress from Inland. Additionally, Bielke prepared for a complete encirclement of Bohus. On 15 August, after being told about the conclusion of peace, Kagg declared that he would "hold to the sword" until he received orders from Queen Christina to end hostilities.

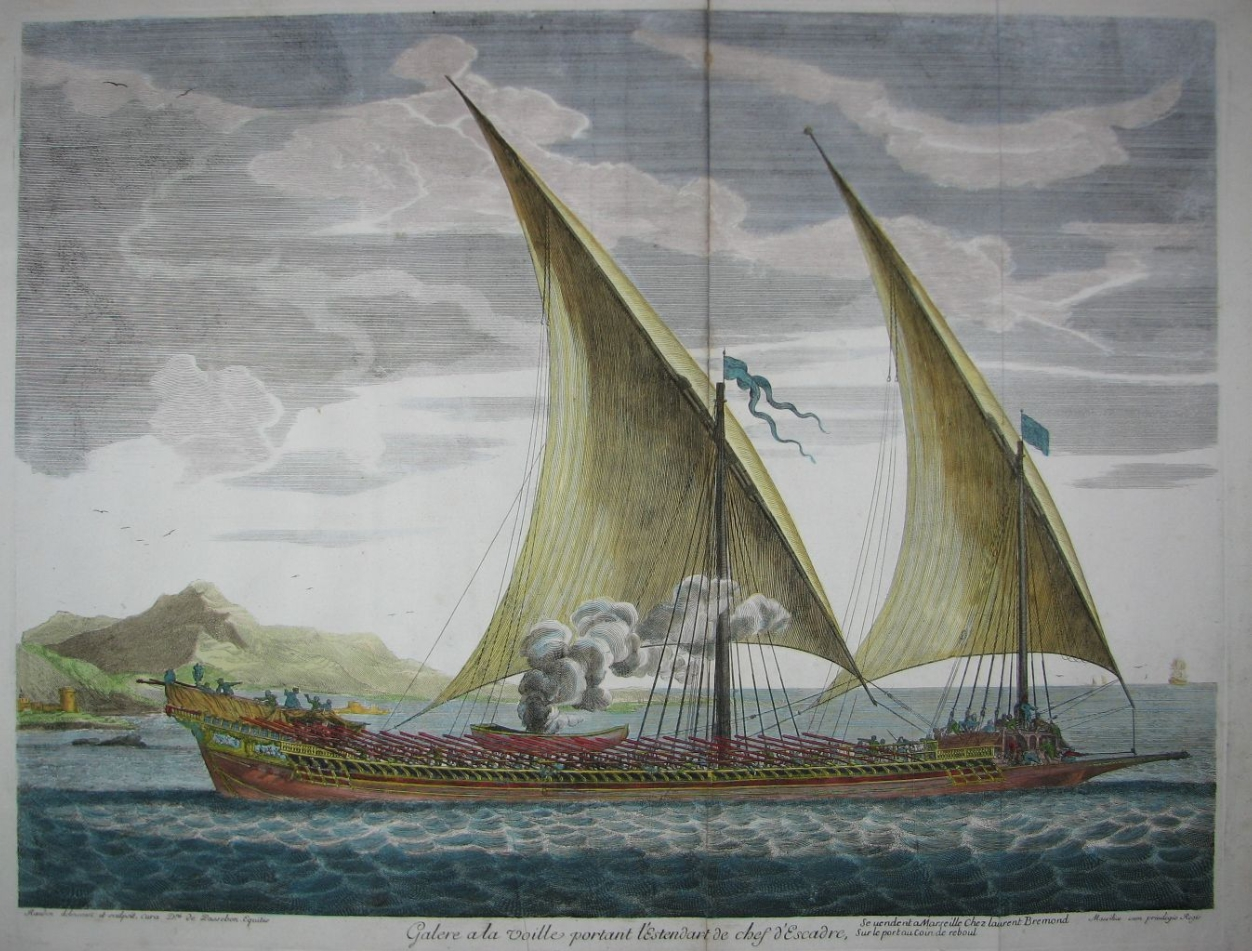
Painting of a French galley by Henri Sbonski de Passebon, 1690

On the evening of 15 August, the Swedes devised a plan to burn two armed Norwegian ships, both carrying 11 guns, as well as four galleys. They could only use one boat for the operation, as all the others had been destroyed after the wagon transporting them overturned. An attempt to seize more boats from the Norwegians failed. The Norwegian ships then departed, sailing toward Marstrand. Instead, the Swedes attacked and captured a boat from Hamburg, which was carrying the belongings of several inhabitants of Kungälv and thousands of rigsdaler. However, the Swedes were forced to abandon the ship after being attacked by three Norwegian barges, though they set it on fire before withdrawing.

Another boat, measuring 80 lasts, was burned by its crew after it ran aground trying to pass the Swedish guard post at Gullø.

On 16 August, a 24-hour ceasefire was called. The Swedish bombardment continued on 17 August, as Kagg had not received new orders. Fifty infantry and four guns then bombarded the Norwegian redoubt at Ladegården, and it was quickly abandoned by its garrison. During the bombardment, around thirty members of its garrison were killed or wounded. Despite its abandonment, the Swedes did not occupy the redoubt.

According to Kagg, he had only some 900 men by the end of the hostilities. He regretted not having at least 2,000 men, which he believed would have let him approach the fortress. Instead, he limited operations to bombarding the castle with half-cannons, 12-pounders, 3-pounders, and one mortar. On 18 August, the Swedes ceased bombarding the castle after a 48-hour ceasefire was agreed upon, and Kagg received news of the conclusion of peace on 20 August.

== Aftermath ==
According to Vilhelm Vessberg, Kagg could have conquered Bohus fortress and the rest of Bohuslän if he had been able to continue his bombardment. Swedish archivist Sam Hedar stated that the "conquest of Bohuslän was already in sight".

In the days following the end of hostilities, Kagg remained on Hisingen. He received orders to leave on 3 September and withdrew in mid-September. Before leaving, Kagg was to destroy the Swedish batteries and "oblige" Sehested to remove a stone bridge that Sehested had built over the river along with the sänkverk. However, Sehested did not remove the sänkverk, as Article 19 of the peace treaty stipulated that "whoever felt inconvenienced by the sänkverk could remove it". The Swedish Government finally issued an order for it to be on 27 September. Nils Assersson Mannersköld was to carry it out.
