= Morten Axboe =

Danish archaeologist and numismatist

Morten Axboe (born 1946) is a Danish archaeologist and till 30.4.2019 a curator at the National Museum of Denmark, notable for his study of bracteates. Axboe is also known for theorizing a connection between finds of 6th century Scandinavian gold hoards and the extreme weather events of 535–536, as a reaction to the 'dying' sun and the fimbulwinter-like climate of those years. Gold may have been buried, he suggested, as sacrifices intended to appease the gods.

Axboe has also published on the manufacture of the Torslunda plates and the making of Migration Period chip-carving ornament.

In 2007 he obtained his DPhil with his dissertation Brakteatstudier (Studies in Gold Bracteates). Like many of his papers, this book is accessible on Academia.edu.

== Publications ==
- Hauck, Karl; Axboe, Morten; Düwel, Klaus; von Padberg, Lutz; Smyra, Ulrike & Wypior, Cajus (1985–89). Die Goldbrakteaten der Völkerwanderungszeit. Ikonographischer Katalog. München: Wilhelm Fink Verlag.
  - Band 1:1 (1985), ISBN 3-7705-1240-5. (in German)
  - Band 1:2 (1985), ISBN 3-7705-1241-3. (in German)
  - Band 1:3 (1985), ISBN 3-7705-2186-2. (in German)
  - Band 2:1 (1986), ISBN 3-7705-2301-6. (in German)
  - Band 2:2 (1989), ISBN 3-7705-2302-4. (in German)
  - Band 3:1 (1989), ISBN 3-7705-2401-2. (in German)
  - Band 3:2 (1989), ISBN 3-7705-2402-0. (in German)
- Axboe, Morten (1981). "The Scandinavian Gold Bracteates: Studies on their Manufacture and Regional Variations". Acta Archaeologica. LII: 1–100. ISSN 0065-101X.
- Axboe, Morten (1987). "Copying in Antiquity: The Torslunda Plates". In Häßler, Hans-Jürgen (ed.). Studien zur Sachsenforschung. Vol. 6. Hildesheim: Lax. pp. 13–21. ISBN 3-7848-1617-7.
- Lamm, Jan Peder; Axboe, Morten (1989). "Neues zu Brakteaten und Anhängern in Schweden". Frühmittelalterliche Studien. 23. Münster: 453–477. doi:10.1515/9783110242218.453. S2CID 165652288.
- Axboe, Morten, "Odin og den romerske kejser" (kronik i Skalk 1990 nr. 4; pp. 18–27)
- Axboe, Morten (1999). "The chronology of the Scandinavian gold bracteates". In Hines, John; Nielsen, Karen Høilund; Siegmund, Frank (eds.). The Pace of Change. Cardiff Studies in Archaeology. Oxford: Oxbow Books. pp. 126–147. ISBN 978-1900188784.
- Axboe, Morten, Die Goldbrakteaten der Völkerwanderungszeit: Herstellungsprobleme und Chronologie, Walter de Gruyter (2004), ISBN 978-3-11-018145-6.
- Axboe, Morten, Brakteatstudier, København 2007 (Disputats), ISBN 978-87-87483-80-3
- Axboe, Morten, "Syv kobberstukne Tavler...'. C.J. Thomsen og guldbrakteaterne. Nationalmuseets første forskningsprojekt" (Aarbøger for Nordisk Oldkyndighed og Historie 2006; ISBN 978-87-87483-12-4; København 2009; pp. 53–89)
- Axboe, Morten, "Året 536" (Skalk 2001 nr. 4, pp. 28–32);
- Axboe, Morten, "Brakteatstudier" (Nordiske Fortidsminder Serie B, Bind 25); København 2007; ISBN 978-87-87483-80-3
- Axboe, Morten & Nielsen, Bjarne Henning, "Ofret til guderne - fundet af bønder. De store guldofferfund fra ældre germansk jernalder i Vesthimmerland." (i: Vesthimmerlands Museum: Årbog 2011; pp. 31–50)
- Axboe, Morten, " Late Roman and Migration Period sites in southern Scandinavia with archaeological evidence of the activity of gold and silver smiths", in Alexandra Pesch and Ruth Blankenfeldt (eds.): Goldsmith Mysteries Archaeological, pictorial and documentary evidence from the 1st millennium AD in northern Europe; Wachholtz Verlag, Neumünster 2012; ISBN 978-3-529-01878-7; pp. 123–142)
