= Lars Kagg =

Swedish count and military officer

Lars Kagg, portrait by Georg Günther Kräill von Bemeberg

Lars Kagg (1 May 1595 – 19 November 1661) was a Swedish count and military officer. He was a political ally of King Gustavus Adolphus of Sweden, a member of the Privy Council of Sweden and Field Marshal during the Thirty Years' War.

Kagg was born at the Kiellstorp estate in Örslösa parish in Skaraborg, now Västra Götaland County. He was the son of Chamberlain Nils Mathisson Kagg. In 1609, at the age of fourteen, he was taken to the court of King Charles IX of Sweden, where he formed a lifelong relationship with Crown Prince Gustav Adolph.

In 1626, he became deputy governor of Narva and Ivangorod in Swedish Ingria. In 1628, he became colonel of in the Jönköping infantry regiment. In 1631, he became commander in Brandenburg an der Havel and Spandau. In 1632, he became governor of the city of Magdeburg. In August 1645, during the Torstenson War, he led a bombardment of Bohus Fortress. He was made Lord High Constable of Sweden in 1660.

In 1647, Kagg acquired Kaggeholms gård, an estate on the island of Helgö situated in Lake Mälaren, today the site of Kaggeholm Castle (Kaggeholms slott).

== Works cited ==
- Munthe, Carl Oscar (1901). Hannibalsfejden 1644–1645: Den norske hærs bloddåb [Hannibal's feud 1644–1645: The Norwegian army's blood baptism] (in Danish). Oslo: Grøndahl & Søns bogtrykkeri.
