= Torslunda plates =

Ancient bronze moulds of mythological images

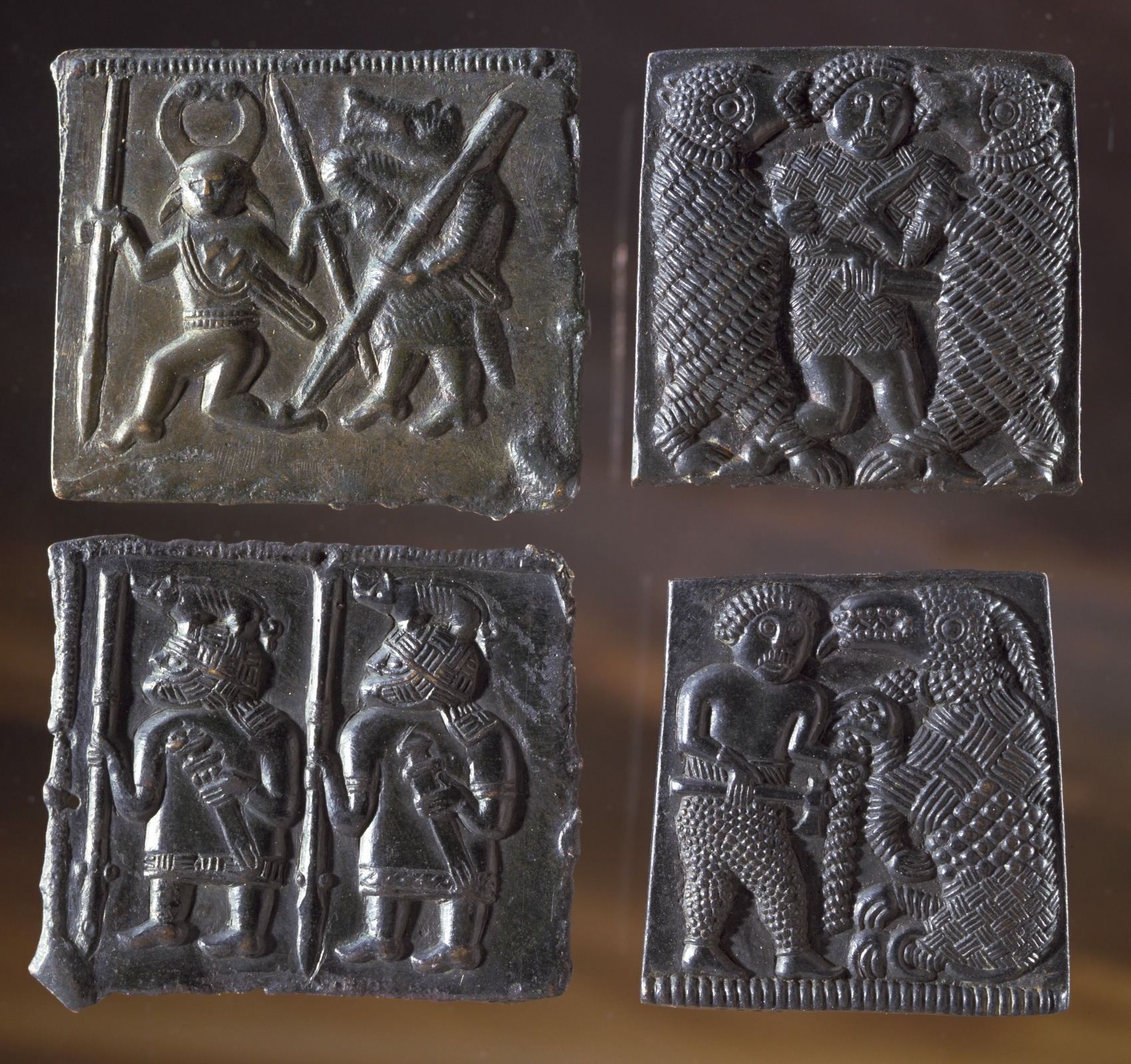
- The four Torslunda plates
- Material: Bronze
- Created: c. 6th–8th century AD
- Discovered: 1870; Torslunda, Öland
- Present location: Statens Historiska Museum

The Torslunda plates are four cast bronze dies found in the Torslunda parish on the Swedish island Öland. They display figures in relief, representing what are presumed to be traditional scenes from Germanic mythology. The plates are moulds designed for production rather than display; by placing thin sheets of foil against the scenes and hammering or otherwise applying pressure from the back, identical images could be quickly mass-produced. The resulting pressblech foils would be used to decorate rich helmets of the sort found at Vendel, Valsgärde, and Sutton Hoo. Two of the plates may have been made as casts of existing pressblech foils.

== Discovery ==
The plates were discovered in a cairn in early 1870, and are in the collection of the Statens Historiska Museum. Their fame derives from containing full scenes from mythology, unlike the fragmentary and degraded scraps of pressblech foils that are known. The plates have been exhibited internationally, including from 13 May to 26 June 1966, when they were part of the exhibition Swedish Gold at the British Museum. The plates have been dated to the Vendel Period of the 6th and 7th centuries.

== Description ==
Each plate contains a different mythological design, traditionally labeled:

- Torslunda plate (SHM ID: 108869_HST) – "walking warriors carrying spears"
- Torslunda plate (SHM ID: 618349_HST) – "dancing man with horned head-dress and man with spear wearing wolfskin"
- Torslunda plate (SHM ID: 618350_HST) – "man with axe holding roped animal"
- Torslunda plate (SHM ID: 618351_HST) – "man between bears"

The warriors in 108869_HST are depicted as wearing Germanic boar helmets.

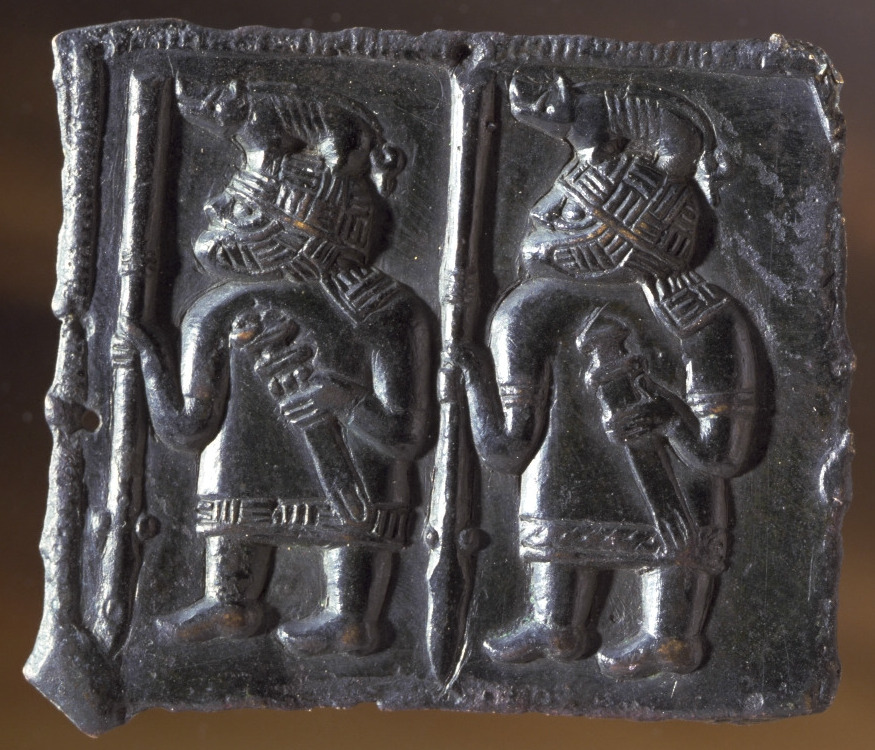
Plate 108869_HST

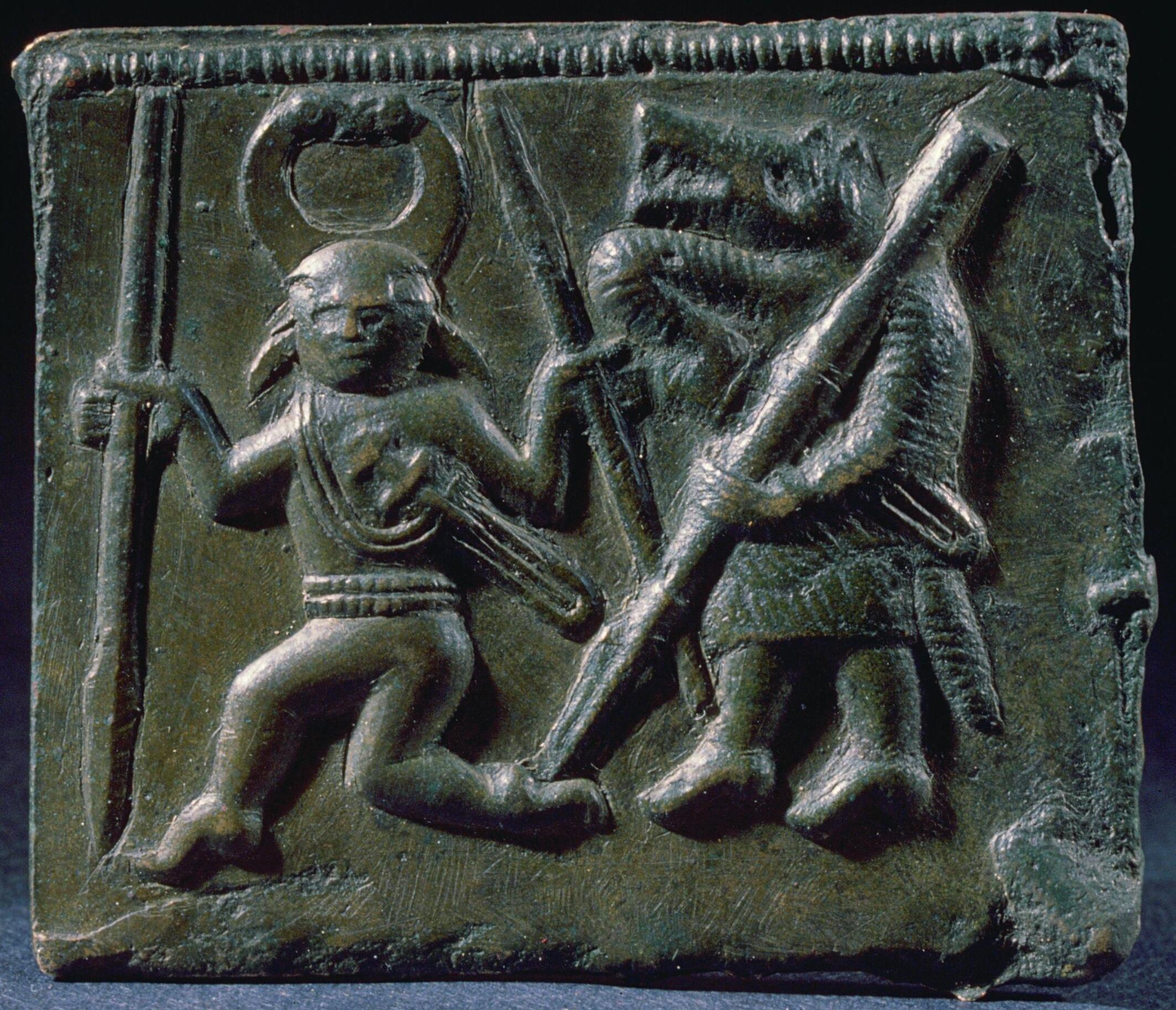
Plate 618349_HST

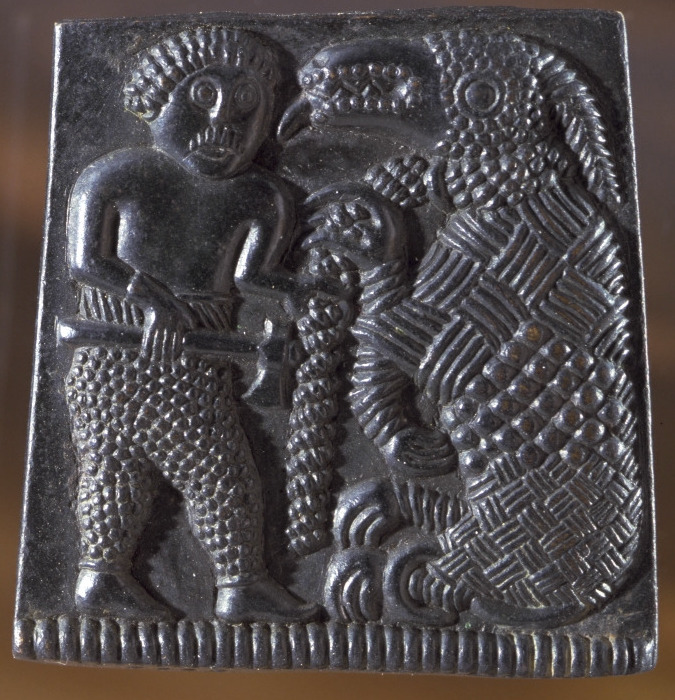
Plate 618350_HST

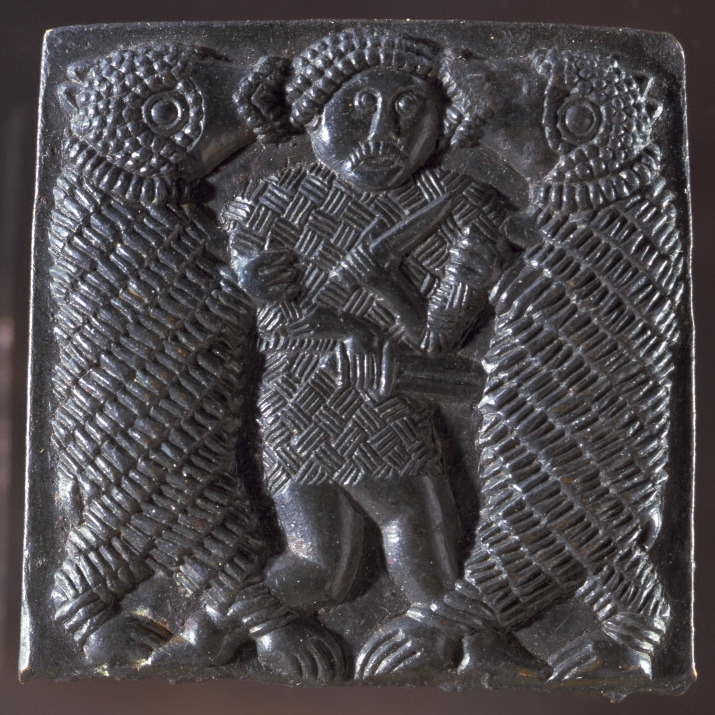
Plate 618351_HST

== Interpretation ==
The left figure on the plate 618349_HST is particularly well known for its missing right eye, shown by a laser scanner to have been struck out, likely from the original used to make the mould. This recalls the one-eyed Norse god Odin, said to have given an eye to be allowed to drink from a well whose waters contained wisdom and intelligence, and suggests that the figure on the plate is him. He is depicted along with a wolfman, interpreted as a berserker, specifically a Úlfhéðinn (a wolf warrior). The latter is perhaps a pars pro toto embodying the wolf-warriors led in ecstatic dance by the god of frenzy.

== Bibliography ==
- Arrhenius, Birgit & Freij, Henry (1992). "'Pressbleck' Fragments from the East Mound in Old Uppsala Analyzed with a Laser Scanner" (PDF). Laborativ Arkeologi (6). Stockholm University: 75–110.
- Axboe, Morten (1987). "Copying in Antiquity: The Torslunda Plates". In Häßler, Hans-Jürgen (ed.). Studien zur Sachsenforschung. Vol. 6. Hildesheim: Lax. pp. 13–21. ISBN 3-7848-1617-7.
- Beck, Heinrich (December 1968). "Die Stanzen von Torslunda und die literarische Überlieferung". Frühmittelalterliche Studien. 2. Münster: 237–250. doi:10.1515/9783110242027.237.
- Bowring, Joanna (2012). Turquet, Josephine (ed.). Chronology of Temporary Exhibitions at the British Museum (PDF). British Museum Research Publications. Vol. 189. London: The British Museum. ISBN 978-0-86159-189-3.
- Bruce-Mitford, Rupert (December 1968). "Fresh observations on the Torslunda Plates". Frühmittelalterliche Studien. 2. Münster: 233–236. doi:10.1515/9783110242027.233.
- Bruce-Mitford, Rupert (1974). Aspects of Anglo-Saxon Archaeology: Sutton Hoo and Other Discoveries. London: Victor Gollancz Limited. ISBN 0-575-01704-X.
- Hagberg, Ulf Erik (December 1976). "Fundort und Fundgebiet der Modeln aus Torslunda". Frühmittelalterliche Studien. 10. Münster: 323–349. doi:10.1515/9783110242096.323.
- Kershaw, Priscilla K. (1997). The One-eyed God : Odin and the (Indo-)Germanic Männerbünde. Monograph Series. Vol. 36. Journal of Indo-European Studies. ISBN 978-0941694742.
- Kovárová, Lenka (2011). "The Swine in Old Nordic Religion and Worldview". Háskóla Íslands.
- Liberman, Anatoly (2016). "Berserk Rage through the Ages". Valla Journal. 2 (1).
- Price, Neil & Mortimer, Paul (2014). "An Eye for Odin? Divine Role-Playing in the Age of Sutton Hoo". European Journal of Archaeology. 17 (3). European Association of Archaeologists: 517–538. doi:10.1179/1461957113Y.0000000050.
