= Royal Patriotic Society =

Swedish royal society

Coat of arms of the Royal Patriotic Society.

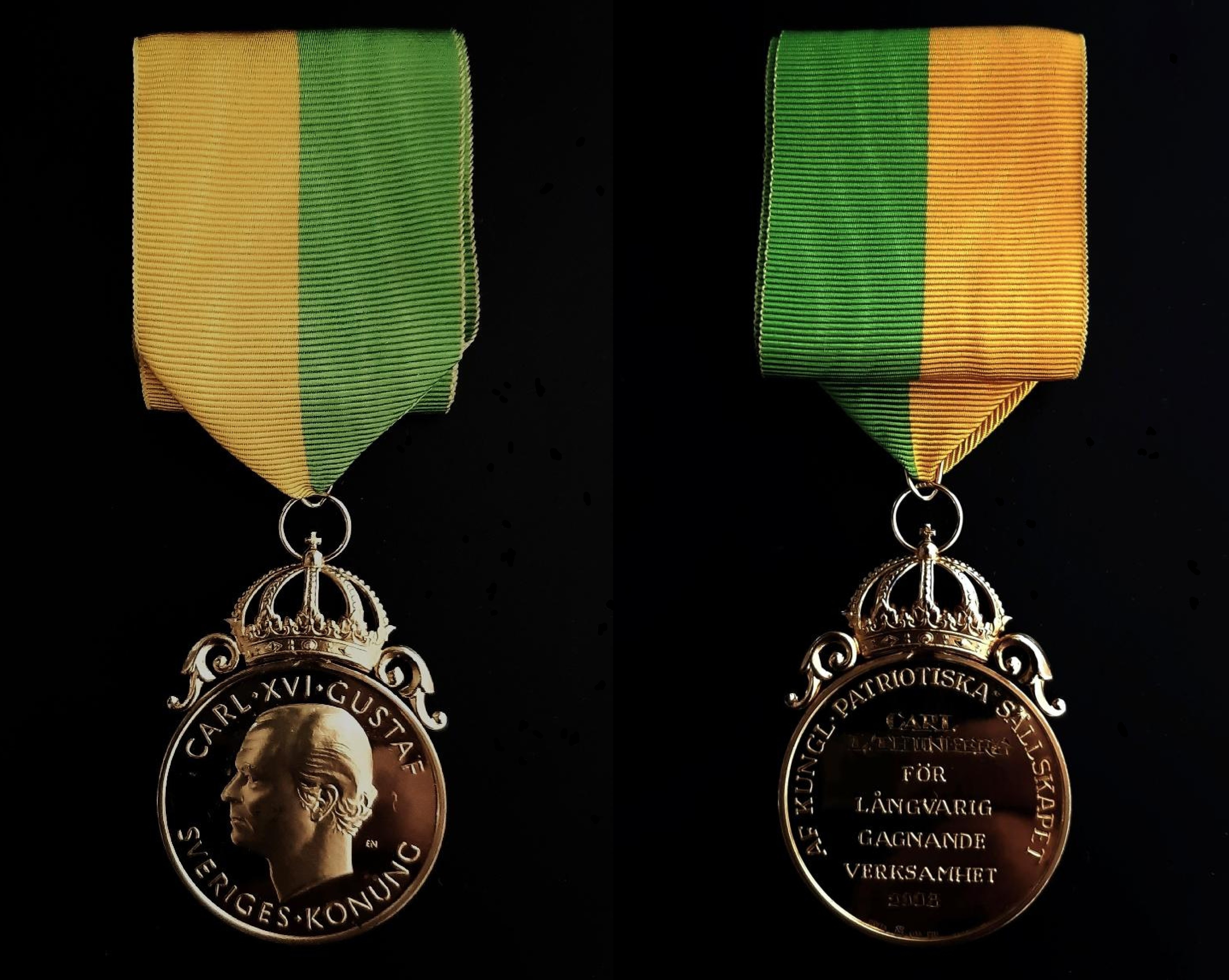
The Royal Patriotic Society's Grand Gold Medal (Gold Medal, First Size) (PatrSstGM) worn around the neck for men and in a bow for women. Obverse on the left, reverse on the right; engraved with the name of the recipient.

The Royal Patriotic Society (Swedish: Kungliga Patriotiska Sällskapet) is a Swedish royal society founded in 1772 in Stockholm, Sweden, by royal charter of King Gustav III of Sweden. The original aim was to improve agriculture, mining and the textile industry.

The Swedish Royal Patriotic Society of today awards medals such as Medalj för bevarande av svenskt kulturarv (English: ”Medal for preservation of Swedish cultural heritage”), Medalj för betydande gärning (English: ”Medal for significant deed”), formerly named Medalj för långvarig gagnande verksamhet (English: ”Medal for long-term beneficial activity”), and Medalj för gagnerik gärning inom svenskt näringsliv (English: ”Medal for a useful deed in Swedish business”). The Royal Patriotic Society’s medals are made in 18k gold.
