= Bååt family =

Swedish noble family

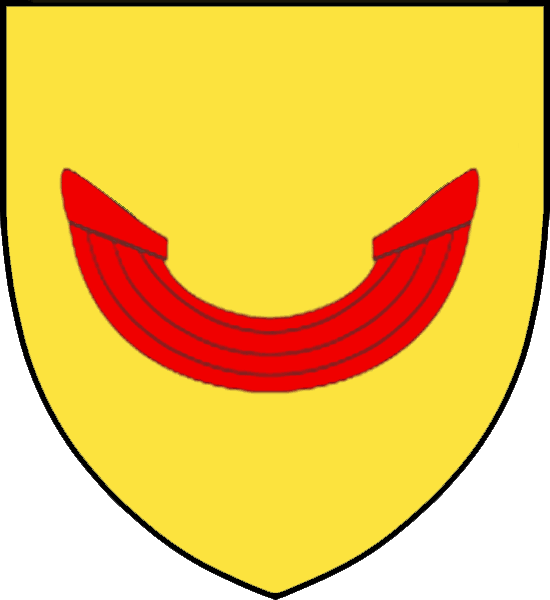
Coat of Arms of the Bååt family

The Bååt family, also spelled Baat, was an old and important Swedish noble family, originally from Småland in south-eastern Sweden.

== History ==
The family is especially known for its long association with Viipuri/Vyborg Castle in Finland (at present in Russia), the bulwark of the then Swedish realm, at the border against Novgorod/Russia. The late-medieval commanders and fief-holders of Viipuri, who were (almost always) descended from or married to the Bååt Family, in practice functioned as Margraves (though not having this as their formal title), having feudal privileges and keeping all the crown's incomes from the fief to use for the defense of the realm's eastern border.

== People with the surname ==
- Sophia Granswed Baat (born 1986), Swedish politician
