= Helgö Buddha =

Buddha figure of the 6th century Gupta Empire period

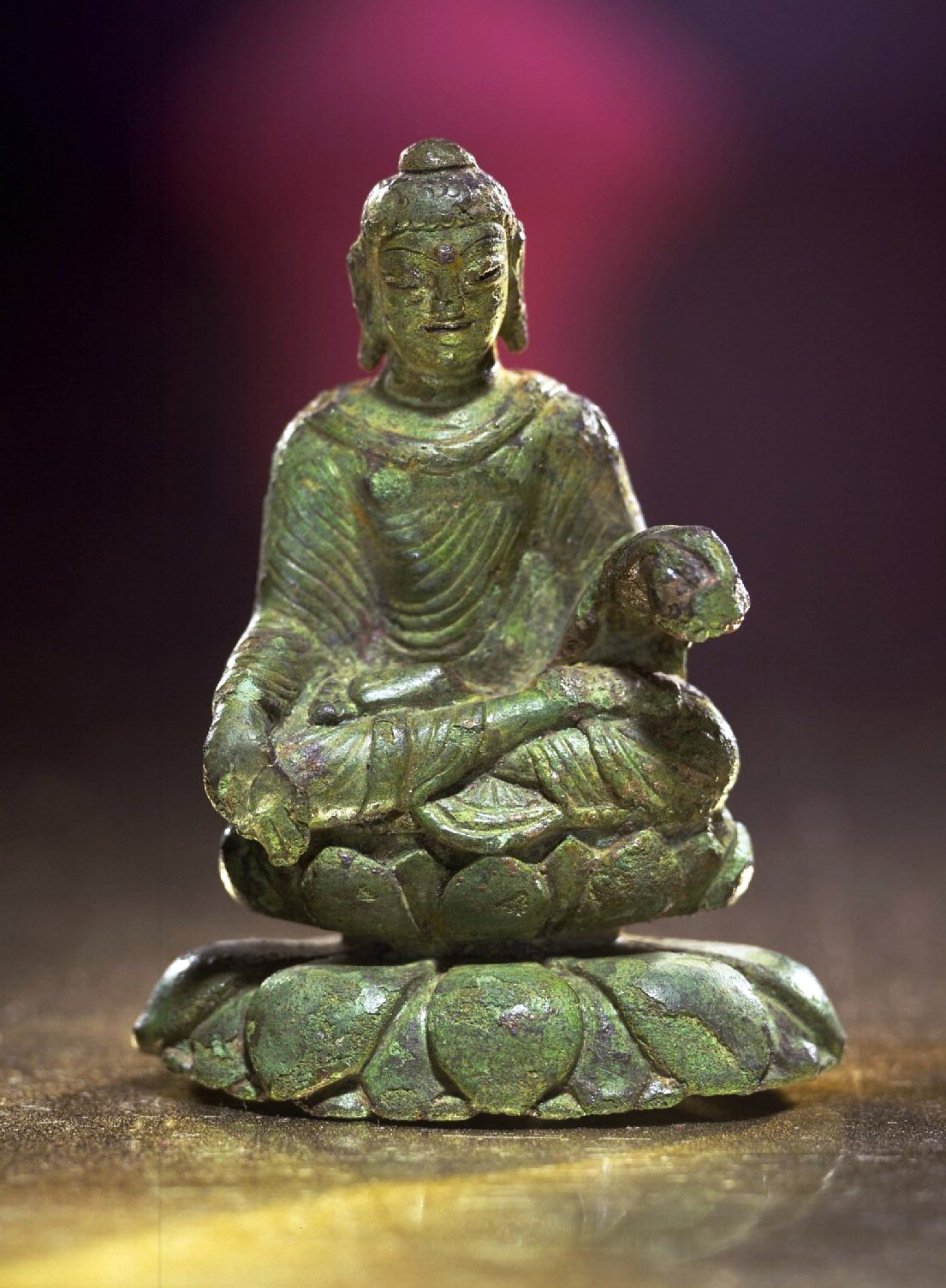
- The Helgö Buddha, 6th century CE
- Material: Bronze
- Size: 8.4 cm high
- Created: 6th century CE, Gupta Empire, India
- Discovered: Helgö, Sweden; 59.278511°N 17.680435°E
- Present location: State Historical Museum, Stockholm

Location
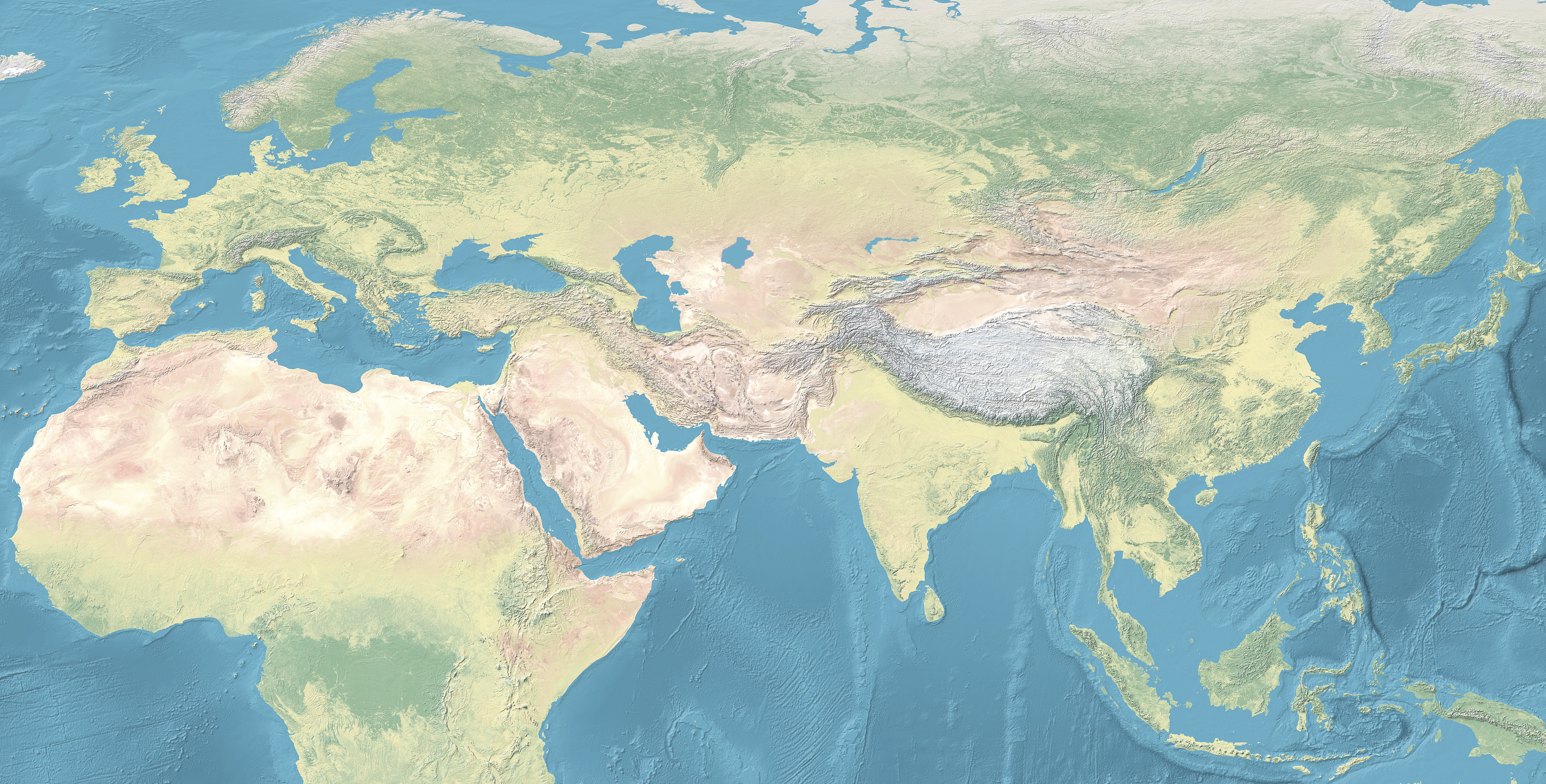

The Helgö Buddha is a small Buddha figure of the 6th century Gupta Empire period, found during excavations at the site of a former trading post on the island of Helgö in Sweden. The trading post would have been active from approximately the 3rd through 8th centuries CE; from the beginning of the Migration Period up to the early Viking Age.

== The Helgö Buddha ==
The Buddha was found with other artefacts from the Migration Period in what was called House Group 2, during excavations in July 1954, which was the third season of excavations.

Other unusual finds have been found in the surrounding area that are otherwise rarely found in Swedish finds from the Early Iron Age, including an Irish crook and Irish book bindings, a Coptic wine bucket, Roman gold coins, a rare Frisian sceatta coin, and East Baltic jewelry. However, the Buddha figure is considered the most remarkable find as it is unique in the Nordic Iron Age context.

== Appearance and origin ==
The Buddha figure is made of bronze and is 8.4 cm high. It depicts the Buddha seated on his lotus throne. There is a gold urna on the forehead, and the forehead, eyebrows and mouth have been provided with dark metal (probably silver or niello ).

It has a couple of rivet holes, indicating that it was originally mounted on something. When it was found, a leather strap was around the neck and right arm, so it was likely worn as a talisman or amulet.

The Buddha dates from the 6th century and is believed to have come to the Nordic countries via the Silk Road. It probably no longer had any religious significance, as it was quite damaged. It is believed to have come to Helgö during the Viking Age. It is North Indian, but the exact location of its manufacture is uncertain, perhaps in the Kashmir Valley or the Swat Valley in present-day Pakistan.

== The Buddha today ==
The Helgö Buddha is today on display at the State Historical Museum in Stockholm.

== See also ==
- Berenike Buddha, an earlier Buddha found in Egypt
