= Acta Archaeologica =

Peer-reviewed academic journal

- Discipline: Archaeology
- Language: English, French, German, and Italian
- Edited by: Inga Merkyte, University of Copenhagen

Publication details
- History: 1930–present
- Publisher: Brill - since 2021, before Wiley-Blackwell
- Frequency: Biannual

Standard abbreviations
- ISO 4: Acta Archaeol.

Indexing
- ISSN: 0065-101X (print); 1600-0390 (web)
- LCCN: 34021573
- OCLC no.: 01460830

Links
- Journal homepage; Online access; Online archive

Acta Archaeologica is a peer-reviewed academic journal covering new discoveries of Northern European archaeological analysis. The journal is published in English, French, German, and Italian and is published by Denmark.

First published in 1930, the journal is considered the leading archaeological publication in Scandinavia. It is Class A, and endorsed by the European Science Foundation

Acta Archaeologica was published by Wiley-Blackwell until January 2021, at which point it switched to Brill Publishers.

== Abstracting and indexing ==
The journal is abstracted and indexed in:

- Abstracts in Anthropology
- Academic Search
- Anthropological Index
- Anthropological Literature
- Arts and Humanities Citation Index
- FRANCIS
