= Helgö =

Island in the country of Sweden

Coordinates: 59.278511°N 17.680435°E

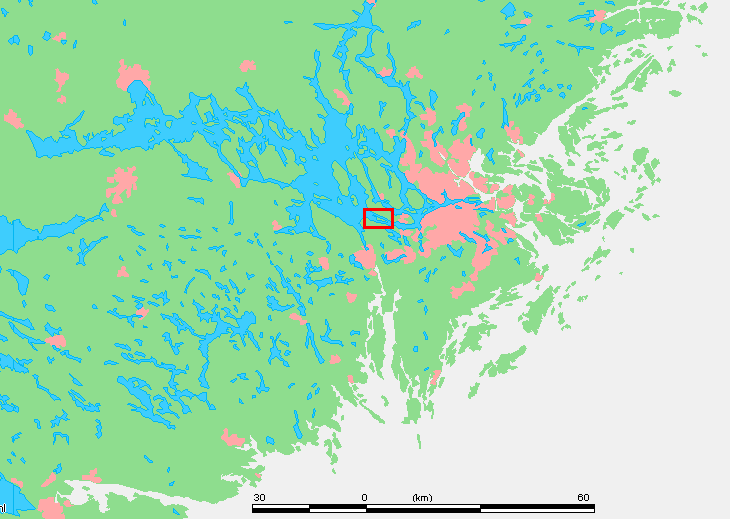
Location of Helgö in Lake Mälaren

Helgö is an island in Ekerö Municipality in Stockholm County, Sweden. It is situated in Lake Mälaren. The island's greatest width is about 1.5 km (0.9 mi), it is about 5 kilometres (3.1 miles) long and covers 48 hectares (119 acres).

== Excavations at Helgö ==
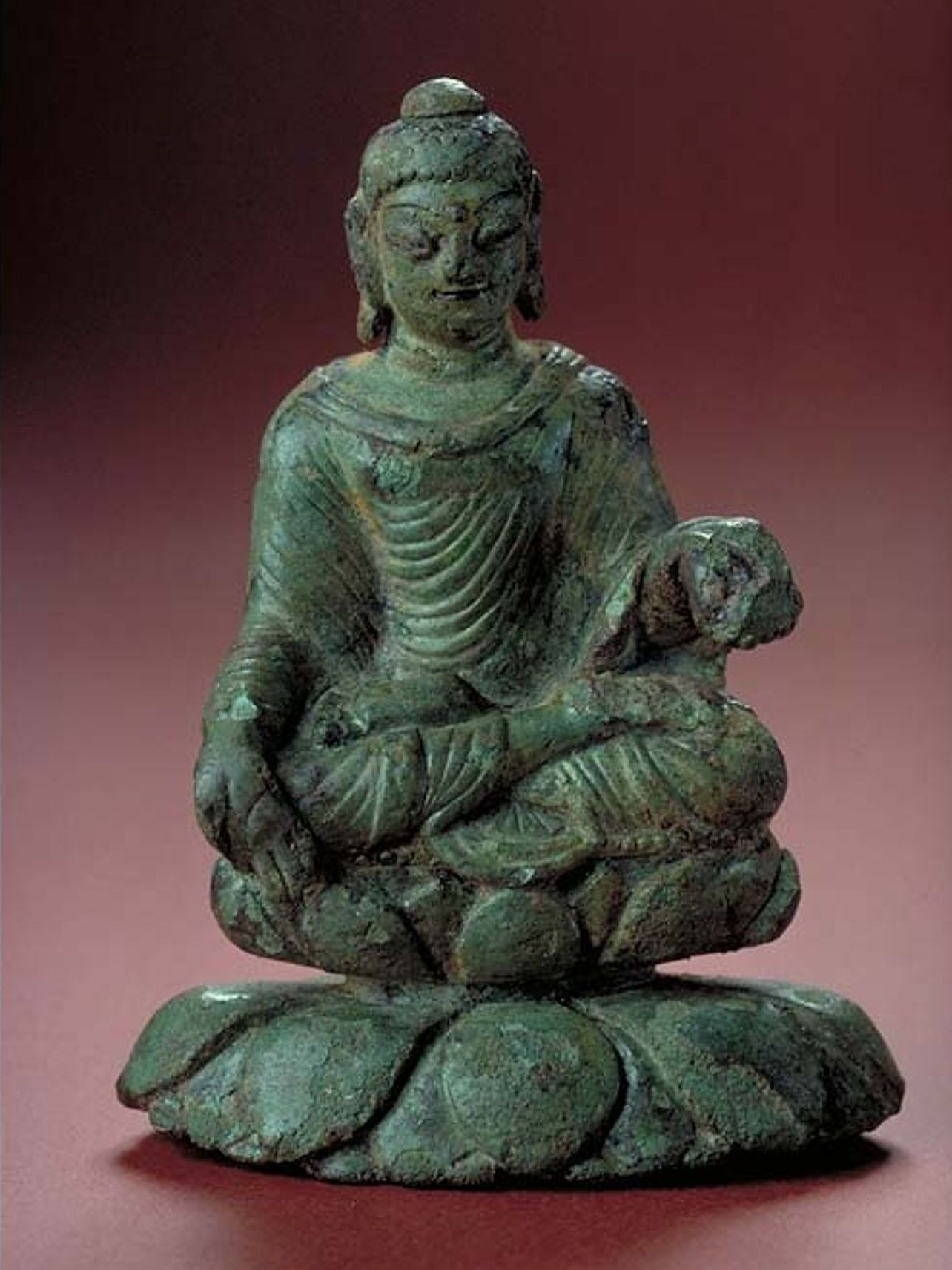
The Helgö Buddha

The island is perhaps best known for a major archaeological area. The old trading town on Helgö began to emerge around the year 200 AD, 500 years before Birka at Björkö. The first archaeological dig in 1954 uncovered the remains of the early settlement, including a workshop area which attracted international interest. The most notable finds included a small Buddha statuette from North India and a christening scoop from Egypt, both dating from the 6th century. The Buddha statuette, the Irish crozier and the Egyptian Coptic scoop, which were found on Helgö, are presently on display in the Swedish History Museum in Stockholm.

== Kaggeholm Castle ==
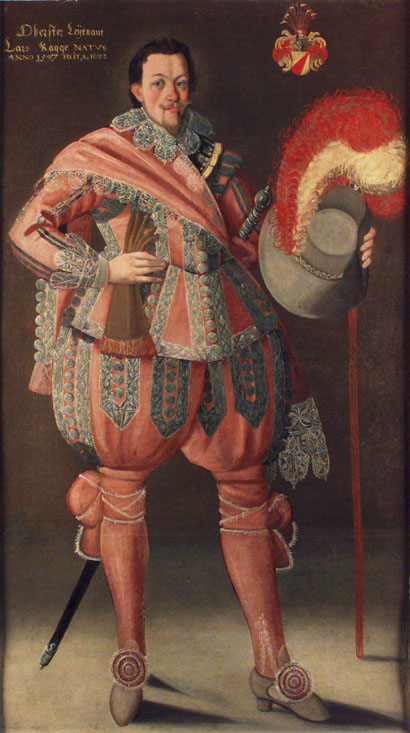
Lars Kagg (1595-1661)

The site where Kaggeholm Castle (Kaggeholms slott) is located was first mentioned in a land title document in 1287. During the 1500s the farm was owned by members of the families Grip and Bååt.

In 1647, Count Lars Kagg (1595–1661) acquired an estate which he named Kaggeholm. Kagg was a political ally of King Gustavus Adolphus, a member of the Privy Council of Sweden and Field Marshal during the Thirty Years' War.

The château-style manor house was built in 1725 after drawings and designs by the Baroque architect Nicodemus Tessin the Younger (1654–1728).

From 1939, it was owned by the Swedish Pentecostal movement. It has been used as a training center by nearby Kaggeholm College (Kaggeholms folkhögskola).

Today, Kaggeholm is operated as a conference center managed by the Swedish property development company Sisyfosgruppen Holding.

== Royal Swedish Academy volumes ==
The findings from the excavations at Helgö have been reported in a series of volumes published by the Royal Swedish Academy of Letters, History and Antiquities, beginning with Volume 1, covering the period 1954–1956. Volume 18, the final volume in the series, was published in 2011.

== Images ==
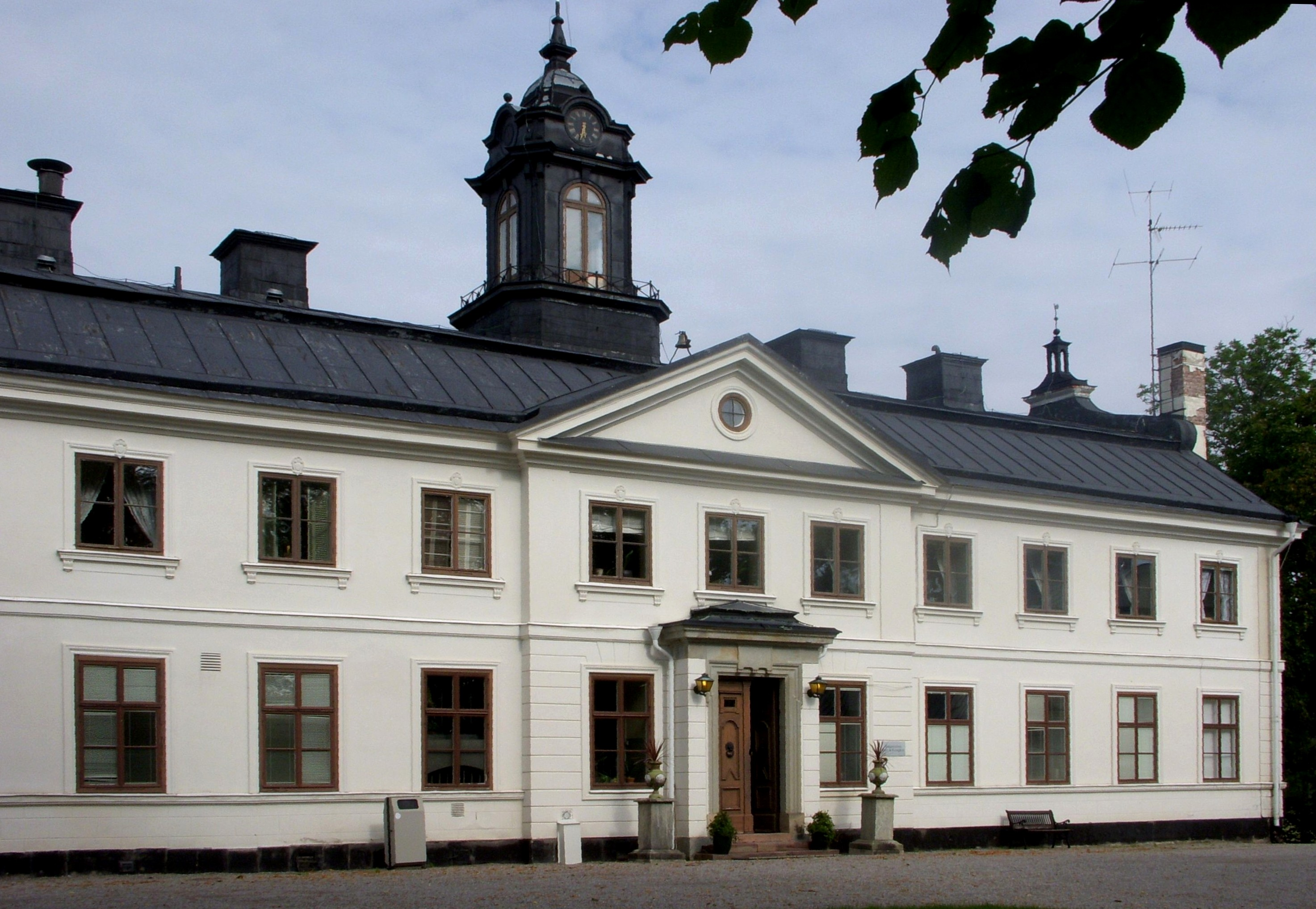
Kaggeholm castle on Helgö

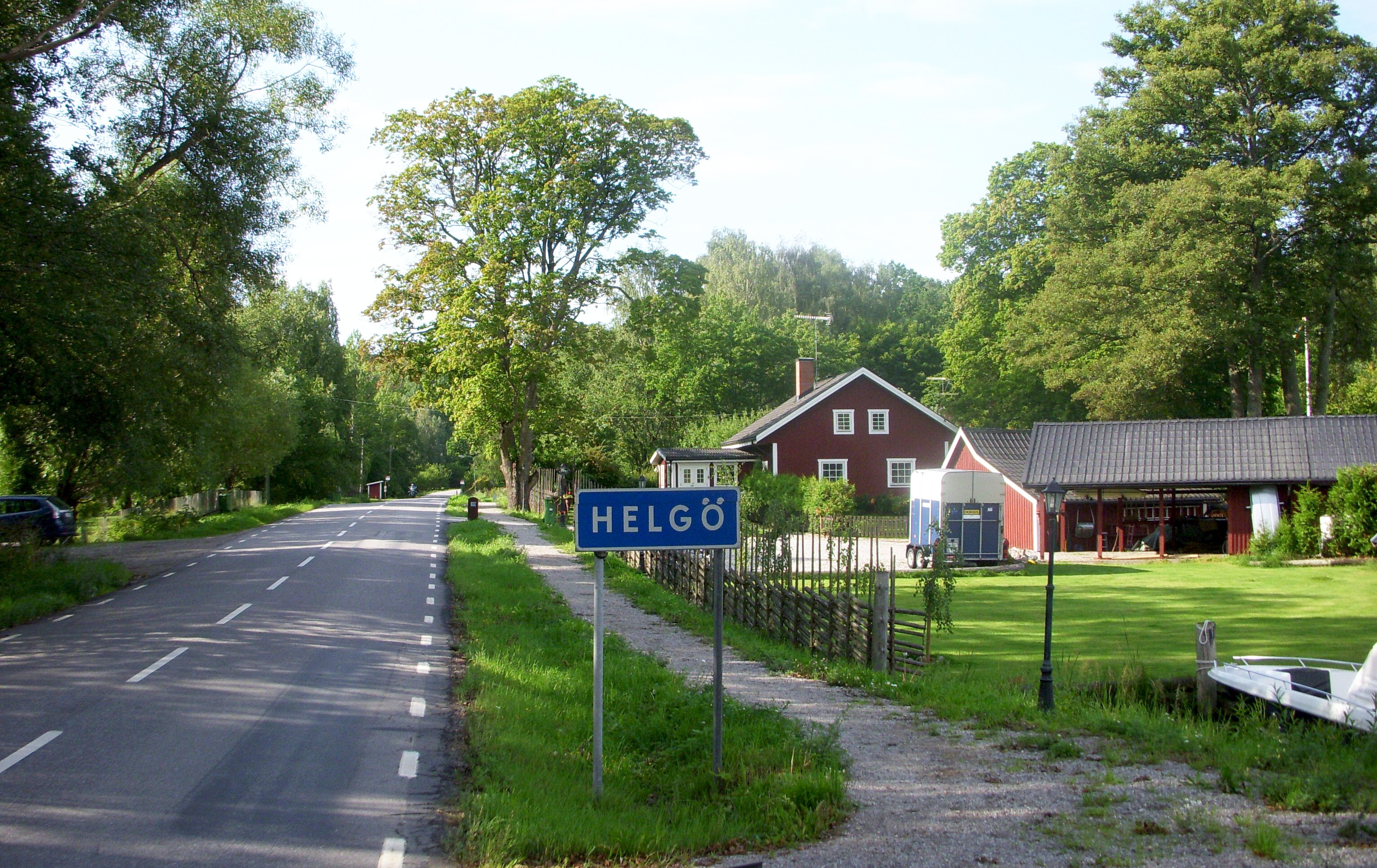
Road sign to Helgö

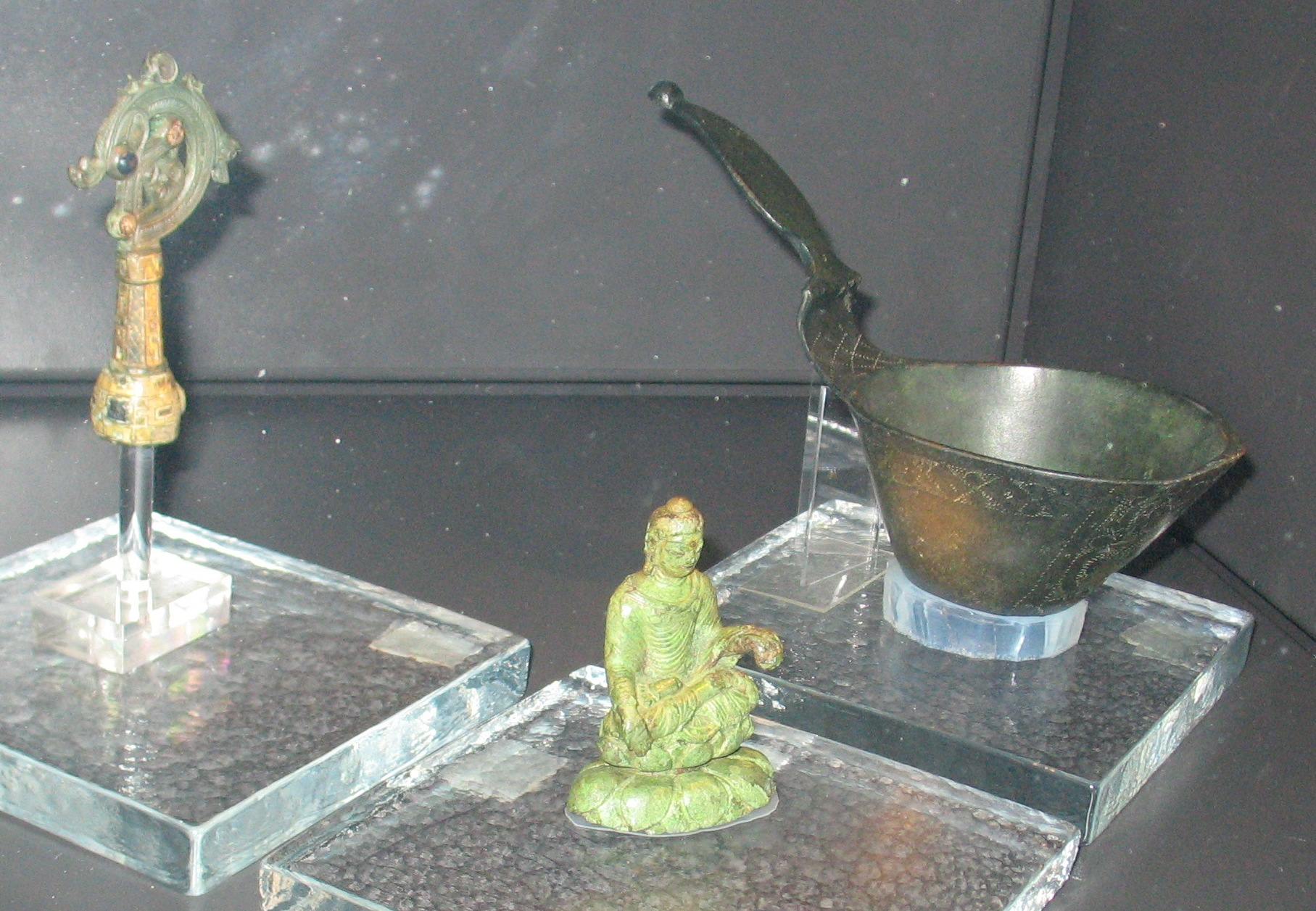
Archaeological objects from Helgö

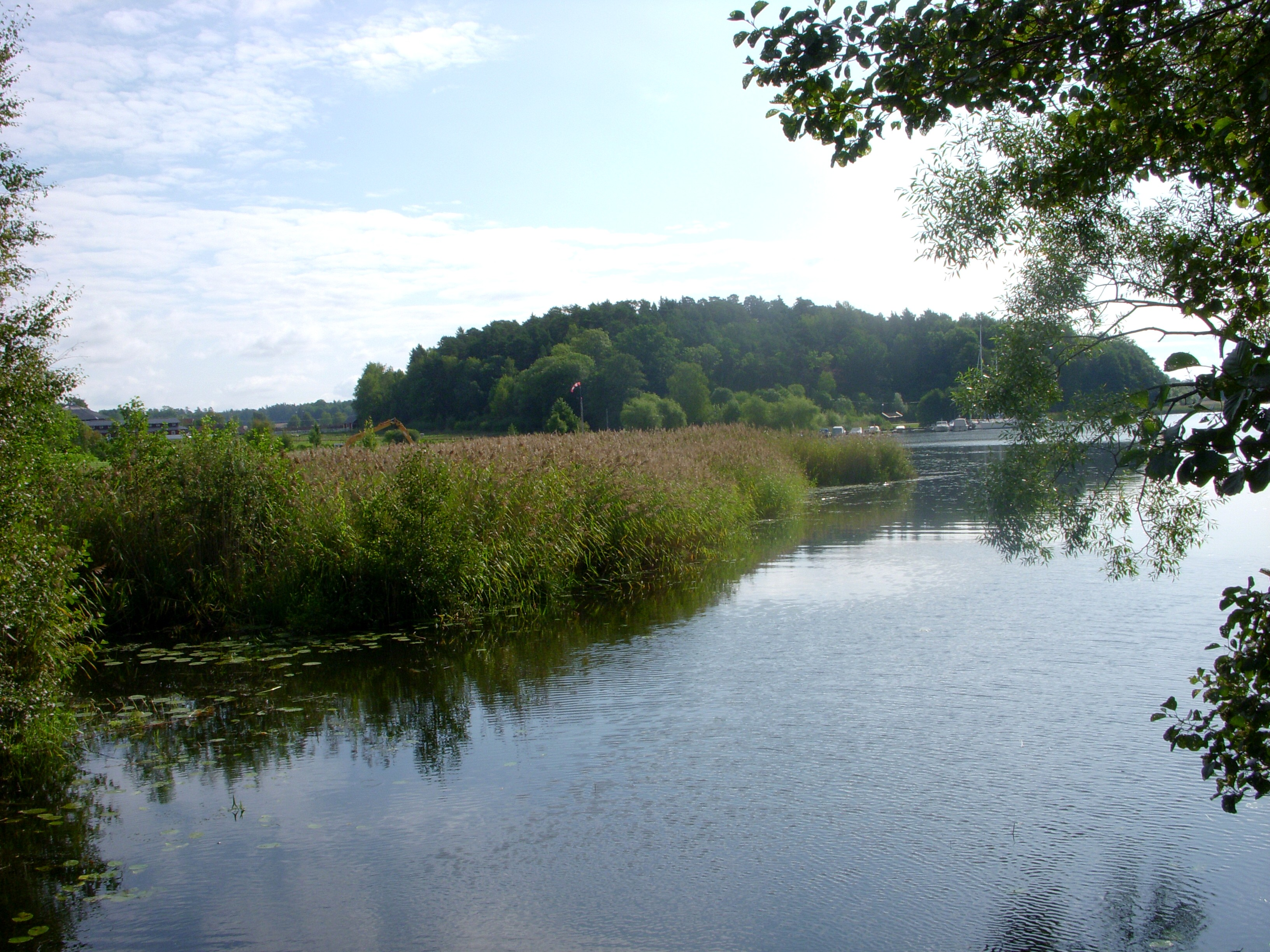
Helgö canal

== See also ==
- List of islands of Sweden
- Wetlands and islands in Germanic paganism
- Birka and Hovgården
