= Hans-Åke Nordström =

Swedish archaeologist and professor

Hans-Åke Nordström (1933–2022) was a Swedish archaeologist and professor at Uppsala University. His work has included excavations in parts of Nubia, submerged since the construction of the Aswan Dam, and the development of the Vienna System for classifying Egyptian pottery.

== Career ==
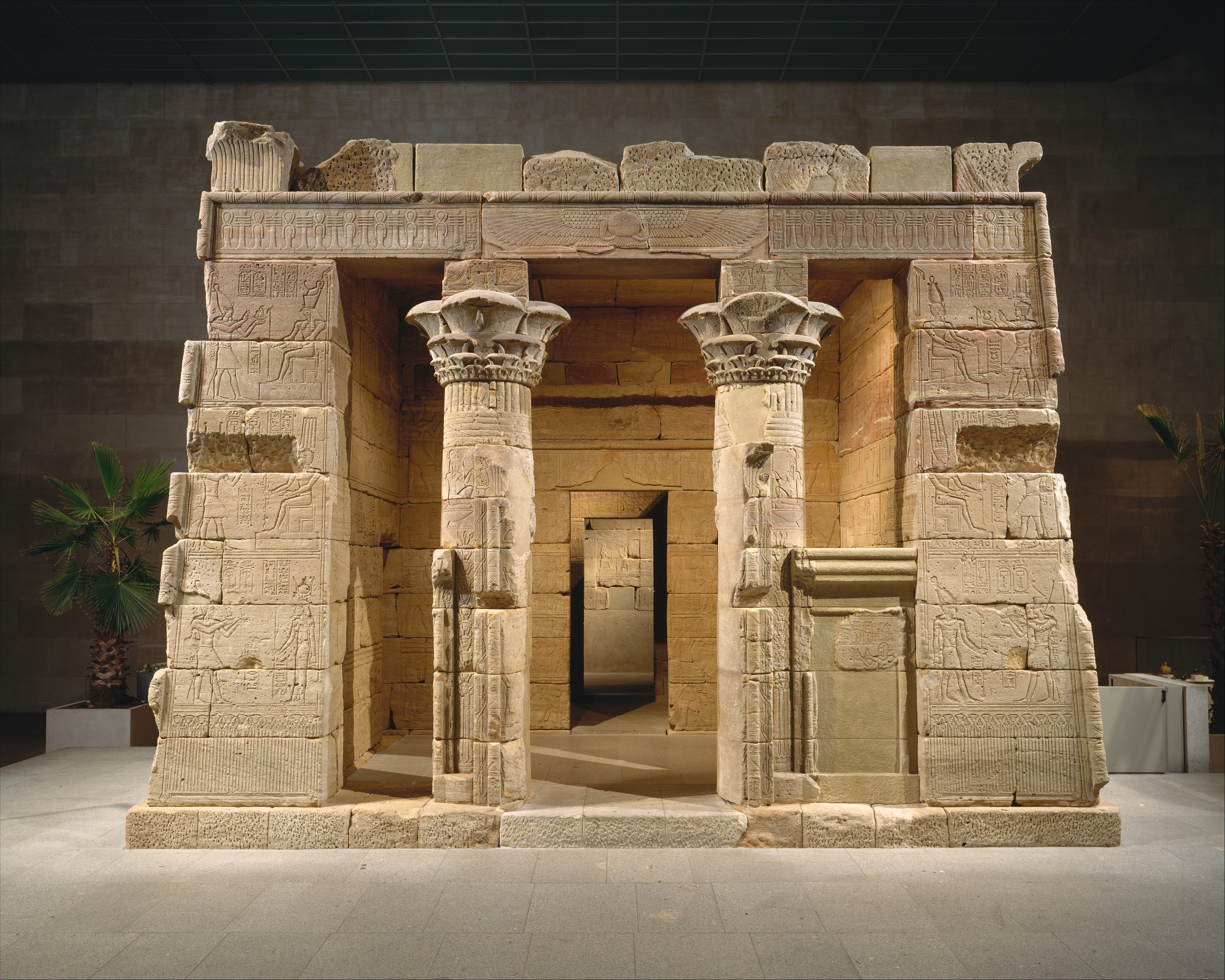
The Temple of Dendur, removed from Nubia before the flooding caused by the Aswan Dam

Hans-Åke Nordström was born 1933. During the 1960s he excavated parts of Nubia, an area between Aswan in Egypt and Khartoum in Sudan, which were submerged following the construction of the Aswan Dam.

In 1972 he received his Ph.D., on the basis of his thesis Ceramic Ecology and Ceramic Technology. Early Nubian Cultures from the Fifth and Fourth Millennia B.C.. The work was considered "an important step into the archaeological science", for offering new ways of analysing ceramics and classifying their shapes. It led to his appointment as docent in archaeological science at Uppsala University, where he was the first person to hold such a position. The thesis also preceded Nordström's 1980 creation, together with Dorothea Arnold, Manfred Bietak, Janine Bourriau, and Helen and Jean Jacquet, of "The Vienna System", now the standard classification system for ancient Egyptian pottery; the name was a result of the system's invention in Arnold's kitchen in Vienna.

Nordström also worked at the Statens historiska museum, where he was Director of the Bronze Age Section. He also engaged with the Technology and Conservation Department, and established a small laboratory for the exclusive use of visiting scholars.

In 1993 Nordström was given leave to focus once more on research related to his 1960s Nubian excavations. Several publications resulted, including, in 2014, The West Bank Survey from Faras to Gemai I: Sites of Early Nubian, Middle Nubian and Pharaonic Age.

== Publications ==
- Lamm, Jan Peder & Nordstrom, Hans-Åke, eds. (1983). Vendel Period Studies: transactions of the Boat-Grave Symposium in Stockholm, February 2–3, 1981. Studies – The Museum of National Antiquities, Stockholm. Vol. 2. Stockholm: Statens Historiska Museum. ISBN 978-91-7192-547-3.

== Bibliography ==
- "Arkeologiska utgrävningar - Ulla Silvén och Hans-Åke Nordström ser på silverskatten från Hållnäs, sannolikt Uppsala 1958". Upplandsmuseet.
- Arnold, Dorothea (19 January 2016). "My Early Life with the Middle Kingdom". Now at The Met. The Metropolitan Museum of Art.
- Arrhenius, Birgit (1994). "Foreword" (PDF). Laborativ Arkeologi (7). Stockholm University.
- Bard, Kathryn (2015). "Box 7-C: Ceramic analysis". An Introduction to the Archaeology of Ancient Egypt (2nd ed.). Wiley-Blackwell. pp. 214–217. ISBN 978-0-470-67336-2.
- Bestock, Laurel (August 2015). "Review of: The West Bank Survey from Faras to Gemai I: Sites of Early Nubian, Middle Nubian and Pharaonic Age". Antiquity. 89 (346): 999–1000. doi:10.15184/aqy.2015.68.
- Hunt, Brian (12 March 2009). "Filling the gaps". Blog: 2009 Field Season. Ancient Egypt Research Association.
- "Lista över radioprogram". Nils Johan Tjärnlund.
- "Verksamhetsberättelse för året 2009" (PDF). Föreningen Alexandrias Vänner i Goteborg. Styrelsen i Alexandrias vänner.
- "2014 Höstprogram: Hans-Åke Nordstrom". Egyptologiska föreningen i Stockholm. 2014.
