= Jan Peder Lamm =

Swedish archaeologist (1935–2020)

Jan Peder Lamm (27 October 1935 – 15 June 2020), was a Swedish archaeologist. He received his Ph.D. in 1973 from the Stockholm University for a dissertation about a Migration Period elite cemetery near Drottningholm.

Lamm taught archaeology at the Stockholm University in the 1970s and then worked until retirement as head curator for the Swedish Iron Age at the Swedish History Museum in Stockholm. He was a member of the editorial board of the journal Fornvännen and took active part in the Helgö project from the 1960s onward. From 1975 to 2007 he was a member of the editorial staff for the Reallexikon der Germanischen Altertumskunde. He actively furthered cooperation between Swedish archaeologists and those from the Baltic countries. After his retirement in 2000, he continued research on the Swedish Migration Period gold collars and conducted excavations of a medieval brick kiln at Saltsjö-Boo in the Stockholm archipelago.

Lamm was married to archaeologist Kristina Lamm and father of antiques specialist and television personality Peder Lamm.

== Publications ==
- Lamm, Jan Peder (1962). "Ett vendeltida gravfynd från Spelvik" (PDF). Fornvännen (in Swedish). 57: 277–299. ISSN 0015-7813. Archived from the original (PDF) on 2017-04-20.
- Lamm, Jan Peder & Nordstrom, Hans-Åke, eds. (1983). Vendel Period Studies: transactions of the Boat-Grave Symposium in Stockholm, February 2–3, 1981. Studies – The Museum of National Antiquities, Stockholm. Vol. 2. Stockholm: Statens Historiska Museum. ISBN 978-91-7192-547-3.
- Lamm, Jan Peder; Axboe, Morten (1989). "Neues zu Brakteaten und Anhängern in Schweden". Frühmittelalterliche Studien. 23. Münster: 453–477. doi:10.1515/9783110242218.453. S2CID 165652288.
