= Runic carving =

Ancient stone runic inscription

A runic carving is defined as a runic inscription in stone or other material, according to the definitions of the Swedish National Heritage Board (Swedish: Riksantikvarieämbetet). The term refers to both prehistoric and medieval runic carvings in raised stones or on blocks, on rock slabs, early medieval tombstones and Eskilstunakista ("Eskilstuna coffins") with runes, runic carvings in materials other than stone, e.g. in plaster on churches, as well as historical and recent runic carvings. Viking Age runic carvings are often memorial inscriptions, usually after dead relatives. The runic inscription has usually been arranged in ribbons, which are often shaped like elongated animal bodies with head, feet and tail. The carving surface is often adorned with crosses and animal ornaments. Sometimes the runic carvings have also been decorated with more complicated image representations. Older, Old Norse, runic-carved stones usually lack ornamentation and have the text arranged in horizontal or vertical rows. Early medieval tombstones and "Eskilstuna coffins" with runes are given the property value "in grave context". Early medieval tombstones and "Eskilstuna coffins" without runes are registered under the relic type gravvård (English: "memorial stone").

== Antiquarian assessments ==
Runic carvings are considered as ancient relics in Sweden if it meets kulturmiljölagen's (the Cultural Environment Act's) overall props and it can be assumed to have been added before 1850. The type of relic also refers to lily stones, stave cross slabs, "Eskilstuna coffins" and other early Christian tomb monuments and slabs with runes. These should generally be considered as antiquities. Runic carvings located on baptismal fonts or other objects in a church should not be considered as ancient relics as the objects form part of the churches inventory.

== Scientific use of the term ==
"Runic carving" (Swedish: runristning) is the common scientific term used by archaeologists in Sweden when referring to runestones, while historians and linguists usually use the term "runic inscription" (Swedish: runinskrift).

== See also ==
- Bautil
- List of runestones
- Sveriges runinskrifter
