= Nordic centre =

Nordic centre or Nordic center may refer to:

- Nordic agrarian parties, also known as the Nordic Centre parties, a set of political parties in Nordic countries which align themselves with centrism and farming
  - Nordic Center Youth, a youth organization consisting of several such parties' youth organizations
- Nordic Centre in Shanghai, a joint project between Fudan University and several Nordic universities
- The Nordic Centre of Heritage Learning, a cultural heritage initiative
