= Reliquary of St. Elizabeth =

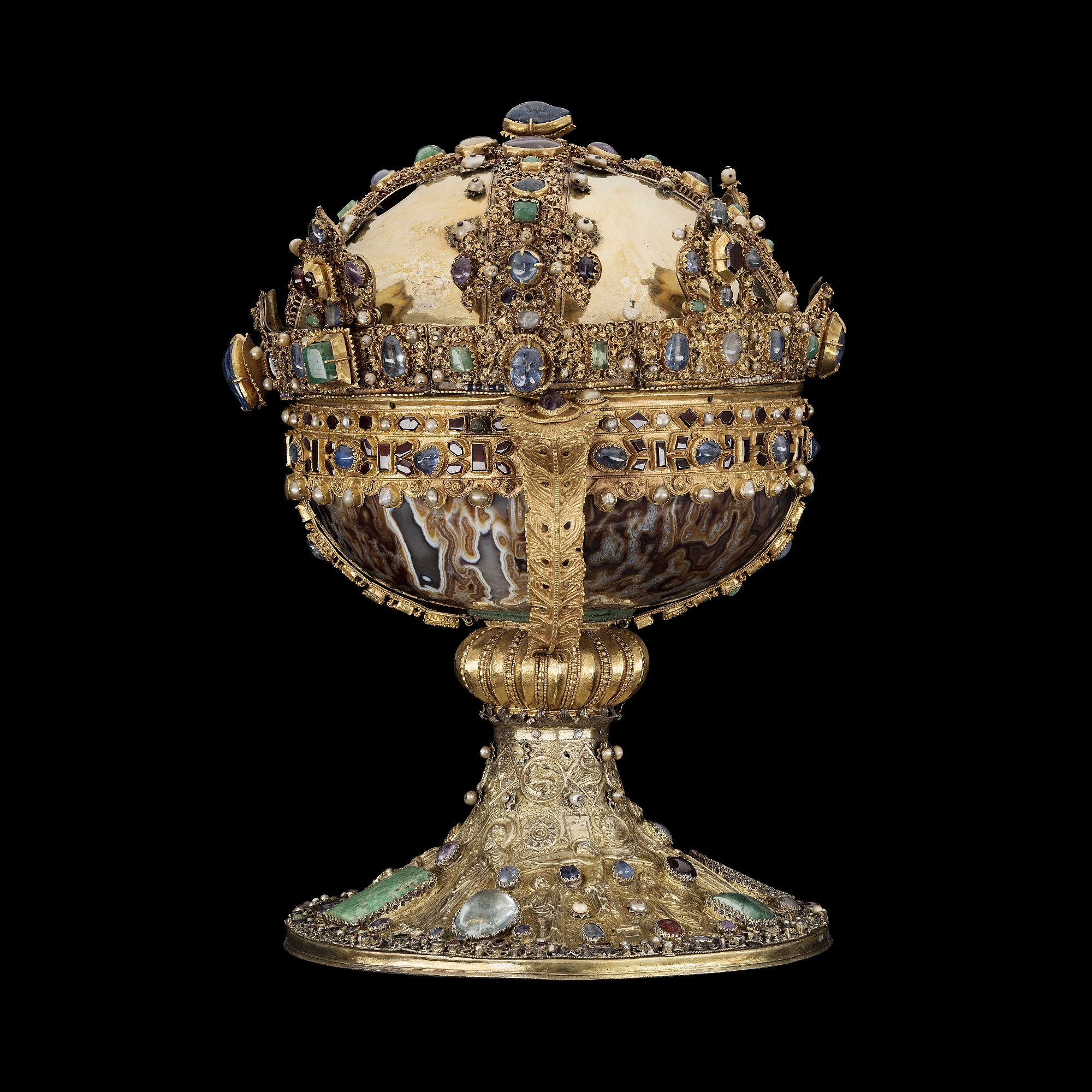
Reliquary of St. Elizabeth

The Reliquary of St. Elizabeth (Swedish: Elisabethrelikvariet) is a reliquary currently displayed in the Swedish History Museum in Stockholm.

The Reliquary of St. Elizabeth is a golden and bejeweled reliquary believed to have contained the head of the Catholic saint Elizabeth of Hungary. It was taken as loot by the Swedish army from the Marienberg Fortress in Würzburg in present-day Germany during the Thirty Years' War. It consists of several different parts from different time periods. The oldest part is an agate bowl made during the Late Antiquity, sometime between the 4th and 7th centuries AD. Other parts were made during the 11th century, and the base of the reliquary as well as parts of two royal crowns that are incorporated into it date from the 13th century. It is today displayed in the Swedish History Museum in Stockholm.

== Gallery ==

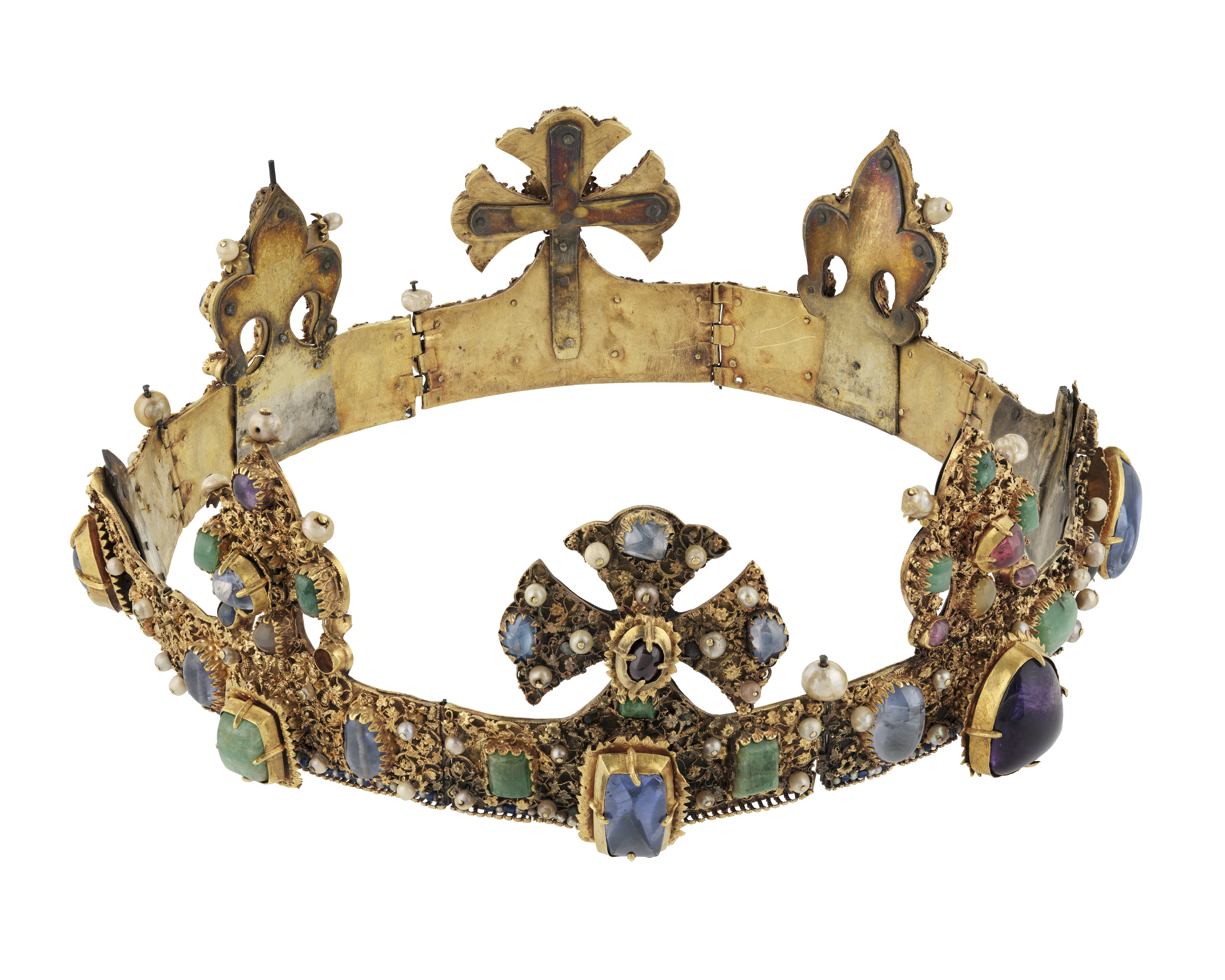

== Bibliography ==
- Weixlgärtner, Arpad (1954). Das Reliquiar mit der Krone im Staatlichen Historischen Museum zu Stockholm I-II (in German). Stockholm: The Royal Swedish Academy of Letters, History and Antiquities. ISSN 0083-6761.
