= Överhogdal tapestries =

Swedish Viking-era tapestries

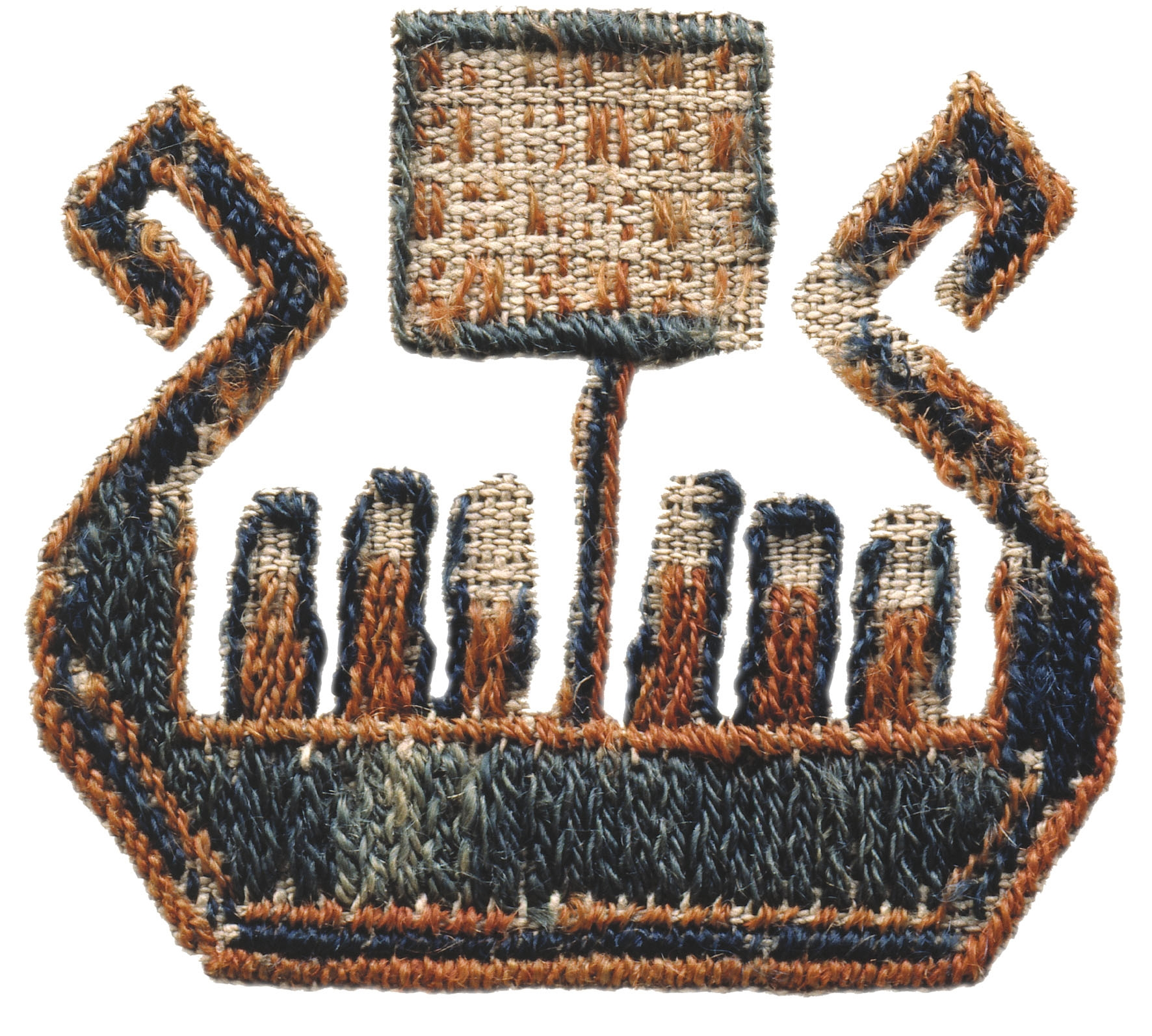
Viking ship, detail from the Överhogdal tapestries

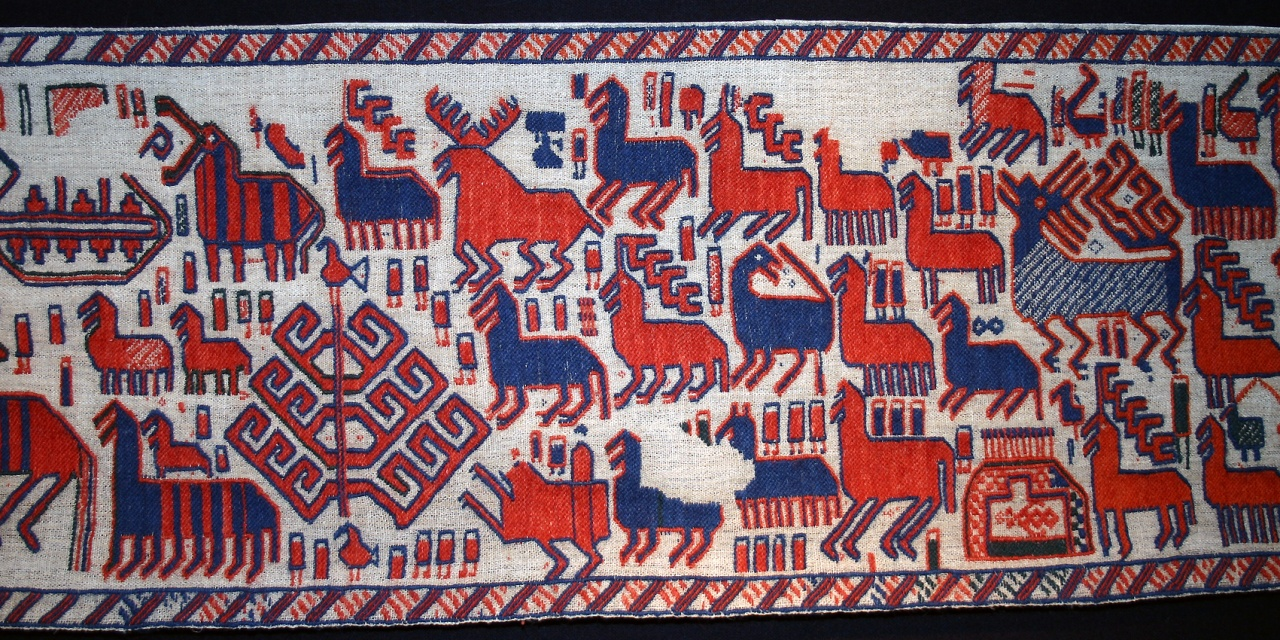
Detail from one of the Överhogdal tapestries

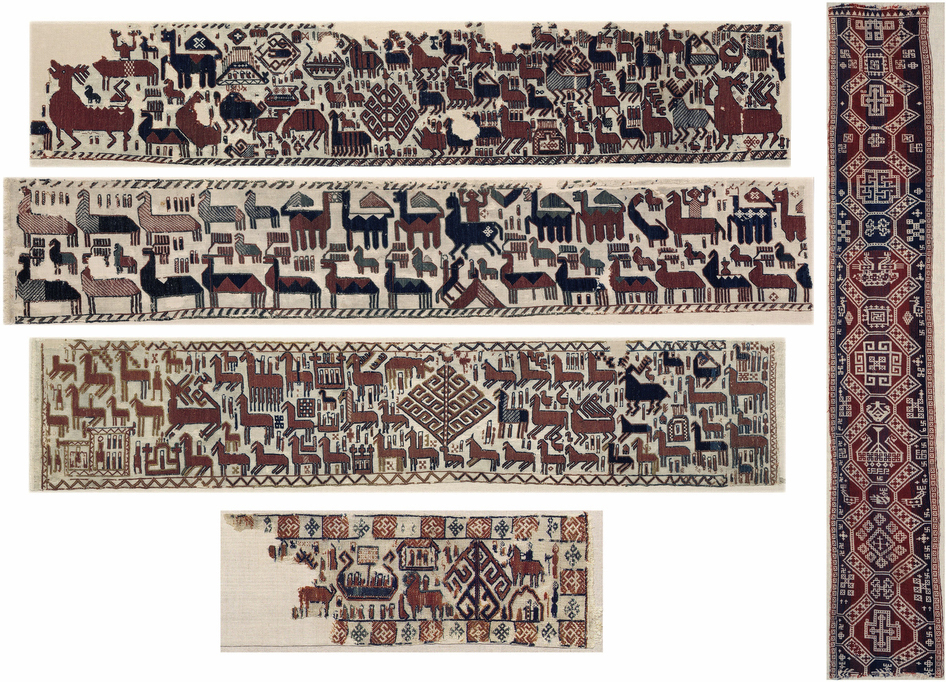
The five tapestry pieces

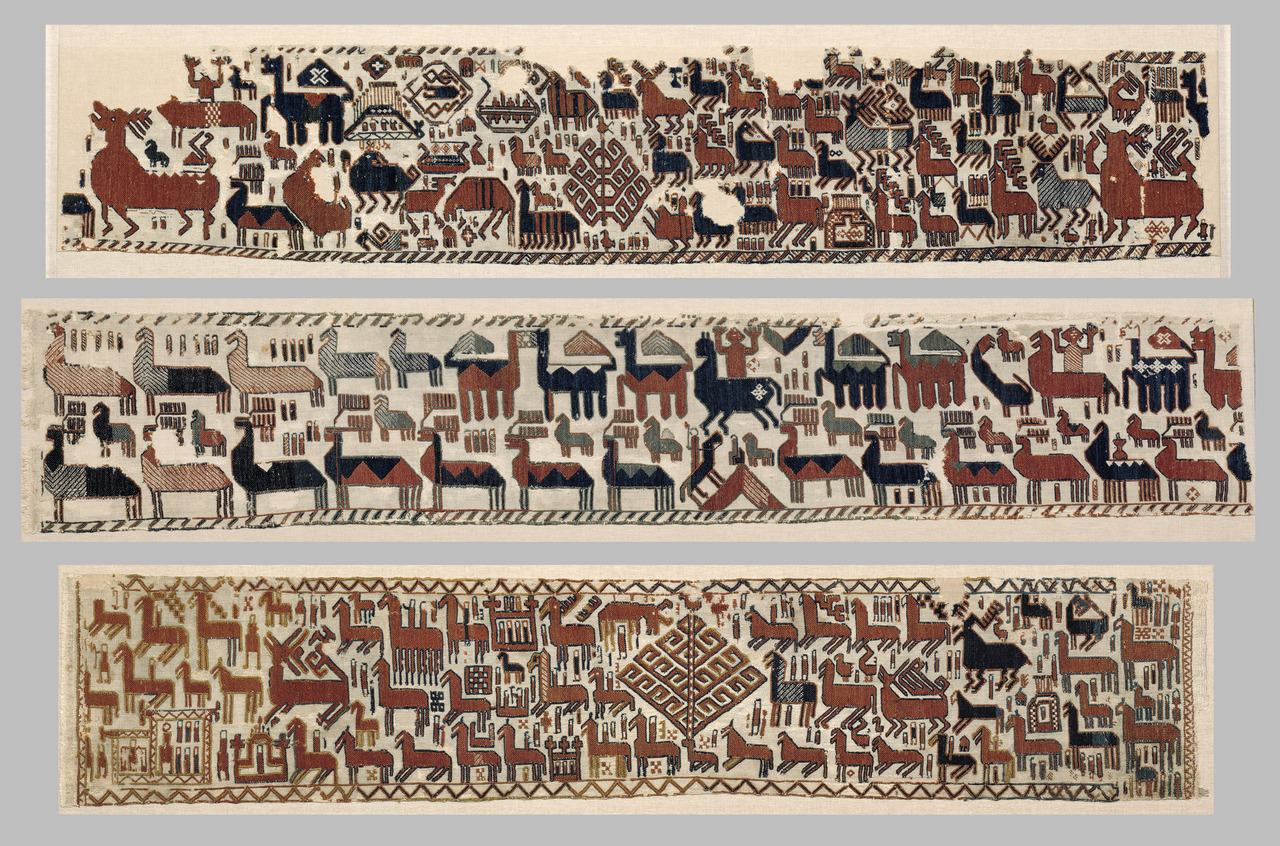
Three panels from Överhogdal tapestries

The Överhogdal tapestries (Swedish: Överhogdalstapeten) are a group of extraordinarily well-preserved textiles dating from the late Viking Age or the Early Middle Ages that were discovered in the village of Överhogdal in Härjedalen, Sweden.

== Discovery and dating ==
The Överhogdal tapestries were found in the vestry of Överhogdal Church (Överhogdals kyrka) in the Diocese of Härnösand by Jonas Holm (1895–1986) in 1909 during the renovation of the church. The tapestries were brought to Östersund in 1910 by the artist Paul Jonze (1883–1973) and the County Governor's wife Ellen Widén, who was a dominant figure within the regional heritage movement at the time, took charge. The first thing she did was to give the dirty linen a good wash.

Radiocarbon dating tests conducted in 1991 indicated that the tapestries were made between 800 and 1100 AD, during the Viking Age. Newer tests in 2005 instead indicated a period between 1040 and 1170 AD.

== Description and construction ==
The Överhogdal tapestries have been theorized as depicting imagery of both Norse and Christian origin. The artwork depict stylized animals, horses, birds and people. There is also a ship, a tree and inscriptions. The four surviving sections of the tapestries have 323 figures of people and 149 animals, generally moving to the left.

The large animal and smaller human figures seem to rush by a tree, which could be the mighty ash Yggdrasil, a massive tree central to nine worlds in Norse mythology. Some scholars have suggested that what is shown is the Christianization of the region Härjedalen. However, today the dominant theory, given the radiocarbon dating of the tapestries, is that Ragnarök, a series of events foretold to occur in Norse mythology, is being depicted. Research has established that the figures are made of plant dyed wool, which is interwoven with the linen with a special technique.

Today, these unique tapestries are on display in a specially designed room at Jamtli, the regional museum of Jämtland and Härjedalen in Östersund.

== See also ==
- Grödinge tapestry
- Skog tapestry
- Bayeux Tapestry

== Related reading ==
- Ulla Oscarsson (2010) De gåtfulla Överhogdalsbonaderna(Östersund: Jamtli Förlag) ISBN 9789179482312
