= Swedish History Museum =

Museum in Stockholm, Sweden

- Historiska museet

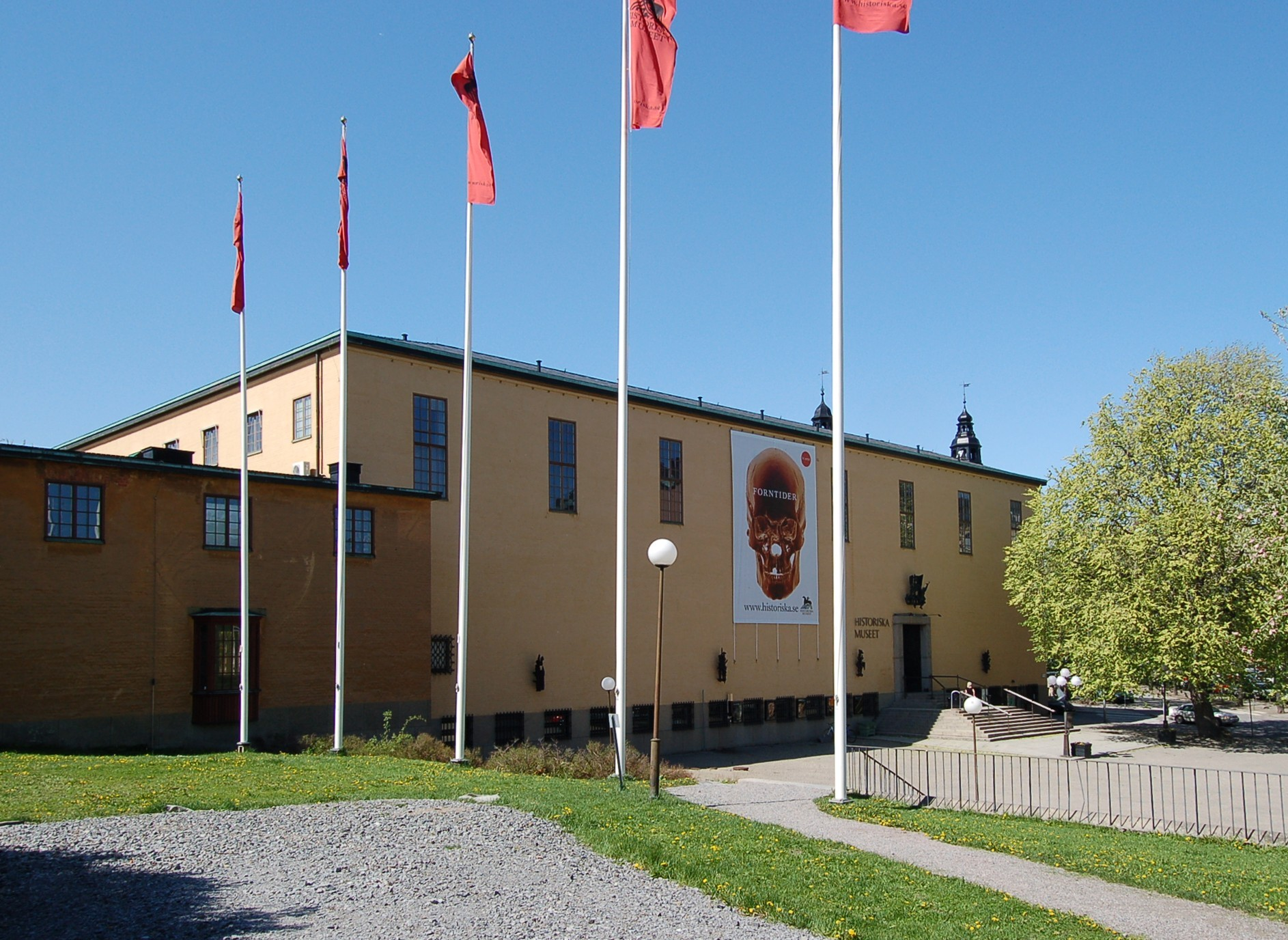
- The museum in June 2006

- Location within Stockholm
- Established: 1866; 160 years ago
- Location: Stockholm, Sweden
- Coordinates: 59°20′05″N 18°05′25″E
- Type: History museum
- Key holdings: The Gold Room; Vikings
- Collections: Mesolithic era and onwards
- Collection size: 10 million
- Visitors: 218,977 (2025; jointly with the Economy Museum)
- Founder: Bror Emil Hildebrand
- Director: Åsa Marnell (as of 2023)
- Website: historiska.se

The Swedish History Museum (Swedish: Historiska museet or Statens historiska museum) is a museum located in Stockholm, Sweden, that covers Swedish archaeology and cultural history from the Mesolithic period to present day. Founded in 1866, it operates as a government agency and is tasked with preserving Swedish historical items as well as making knowledge about history available to the public.

The origin of the museum is the collections of art and historical objects gathered by Swedish monarchs since the 16th century. It has a number of permanent exhibitions and annually hosts special exhibitions tied to current events.

== Function ==
The History Museum is part of a central museum agency called the Statens historiska museer (SHM) ("National Historical Museums"). Other museums under the aegis of this agency are The Royal Armouries, The Economy Museum, Skokloster Castle, The Hallwyl Museum, The Tumba Papermill Museum and The Swedish Holocaust Museum.

== History ==
Axel Bagge and colleagues in one of the museum's storage rooms in 1939.

The foundation for what was to become the Swedish History Museum and the Nationalmuseum, was King Gustav Vasa's 16th century art collection at Gripsholm Castle. The collection grew through acquisitions, gifts and spoils of war during the time of the Swedish Empire. Some of the collections were lost during the fire in the Tre Kronor castle. During the later part of the 18th century, art and antiquities were bought by ambassadors and members of the royal family and collected at Stockholm Palace. After the death of King Gustaf III in 1792, the collections were turned over to the Swedish government. That same year the Royal Museum (Kongl. Museum) opened in the palace. It was one of the first public museums in the world. In 1846–47, the museum moved from the palace to the Ridderstolpe House at Skeppsbron where it resided until 1865 and the move to Nationalmuseum. Swedish archaeologist Stig Welinder argues that the History Museum was in fact founded with its establishment in the Ridderstolpe House in 1847.

The present-day museum was founded in 1866 by Bror Emil Hildebrand, who had been director of its predecessor both at Stockholm Palace and Ridderstolpe House. The collections of the museum were exhibited on the ground floor of the recently built Nationalmuseum. The premises soon became too small for both museums. When plans for the new Nordic Museum building were made in 1876, it was suggested that the building should also include the History Museum's collections. The debate about housing for the History Museum continued for decades until Sigurd Curman became Custodian of Ancient Monuments (riksantikvarie) and head of the Swedish National Heritage Board on 3 July 1923. He moved the issue forward to a more concrete and permanent solution. The main objective for a new and sufficiently large building for the museum was to bring order to the collections, commonly called "The Chaos" while the unpublished research papers were referred to as "the corf".

In 1929, the Swedish government suggested that the former military barracks and stables at Storgatan in the city block known as the Krubban ("the crib"), could be allocated to the museum. An architectural competition was held in 1930, for the proposed conversion of the block into suitable accommodation for the museum. No winner was declared, instead it was elements from the runner-up suggestion, made by architects Bengt Romare and George Scherman with engineer Gösta Nilsson, that became the starting point for the remodeling of the area. They developed the design for the new museum in cooperation with Curman, the National Property Board and the National Heritage Board.

== Architecture ==
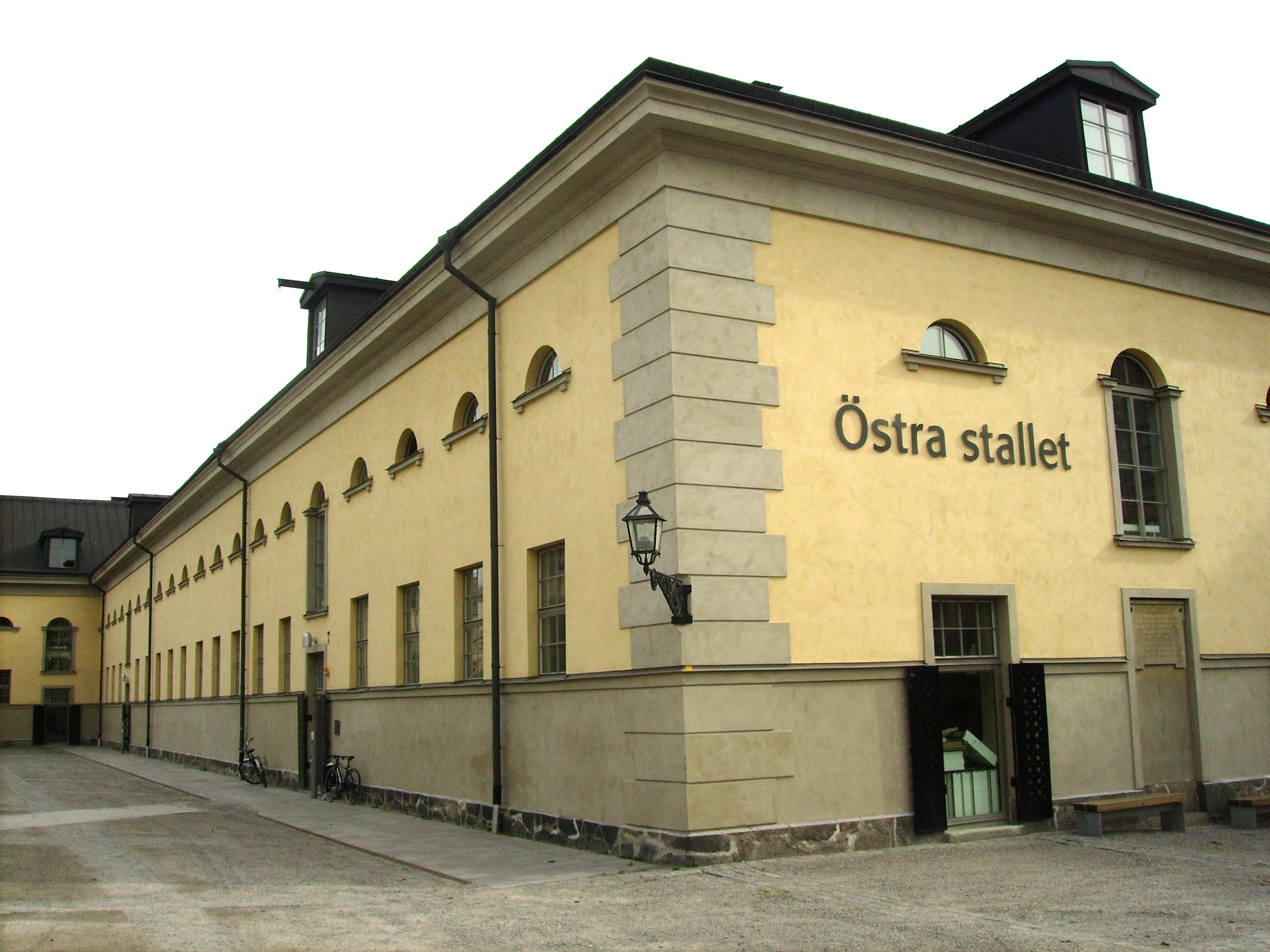
The Eastern Stable

In 1932, the Swedish government granted funds for construction of official buildings to create jobs during the depression. Some of these were used to build the museum in 1934–39. The plans for the museum were not finalized until 1936.

=== Exterior ===
The main building, designed by Romare and Scherman 1935–1940, reflects an ambivalence between the predominant modern style of the era and the historical context given not only by the context requirements, but also the 19th century barracks and stables south of the museum designed by Fredrik Blom and built in stages in 1805–1818, starting one year after the land had been appropriated by the government. The barracks are neoclassicist in style and the repetitive façades used to be exposed to Ladugårdslandsviken that was part of Stockholm's main harbor up until the 19th century, while the main building forms a compact block taking a step backwards from the street to leave space for a forecourt.

The museum consists of four two- and three-story block-like buildings surrounding an inner courtyard, giving it the appearance of a fortress. The façade is austere and decorated with sculptures made by Bror Marklund (added in 1959) and reliefs by artist Robert Nilsson. In the courtyard by a pool is a sculpture called Näcken (The Neck) by Carl Frisendahl.

==== The bronze doors ====
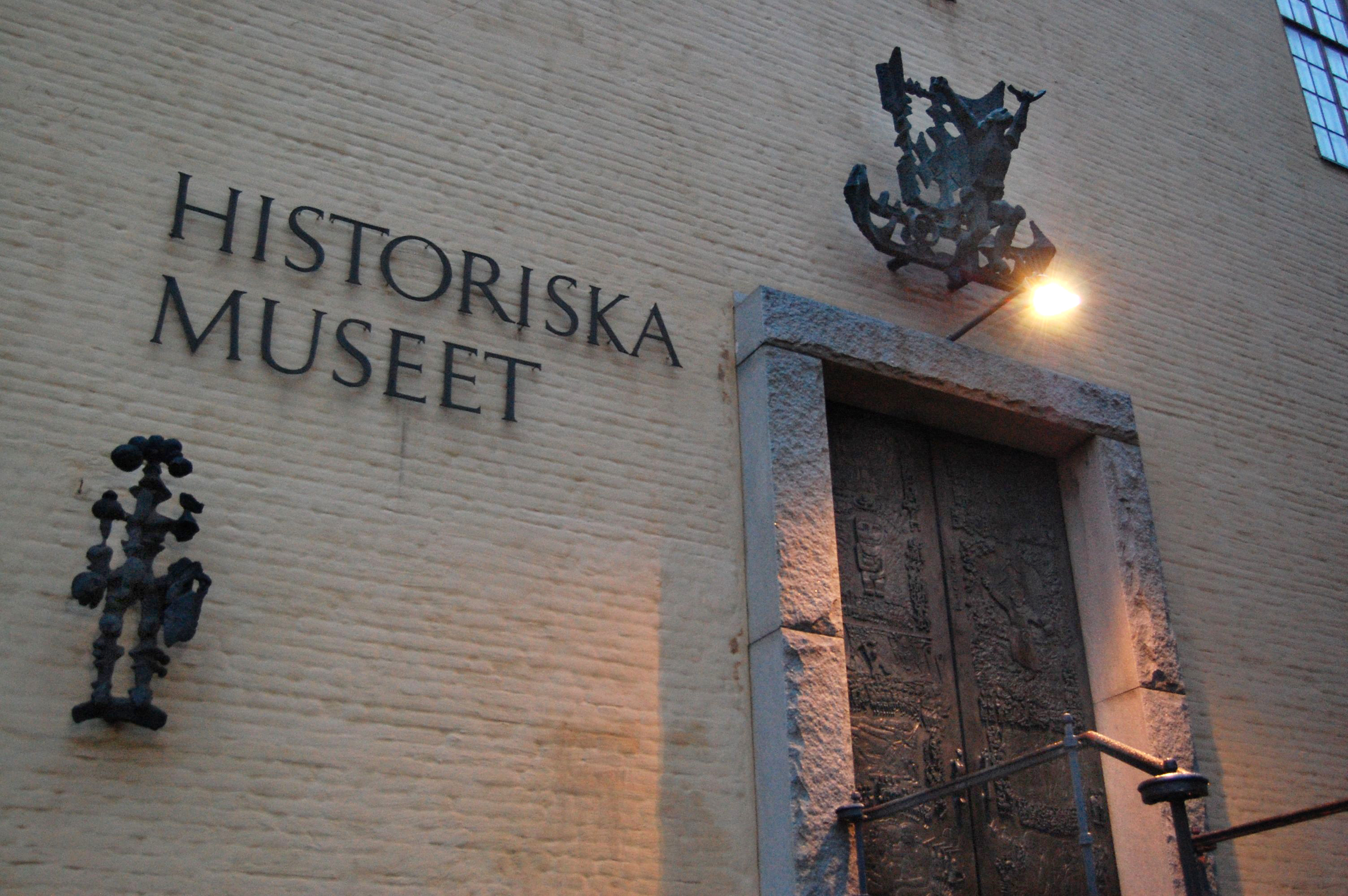
Sculptures and doors by Bror Marklund

Most of the decorations of the museum were selected through a series of competitions. In 1938, Marklund won the competition for creating the main entrance to the museum. The doors, called The Gates of History (Historiens Portar), took him thirteen years to make. They were finished and inaugurated in 1952. The doors were financed by philanthropist Eva Bonnier's foundation.

The doors are 4.5 m (15 ft) high and weighs about 1 t (2,200 lb) each. Made of bronze, they were first cast at the Herman Bergman foundry and then chased by Marklund.

Through a series of ten fields, the doors depict the history of Sweden from the Stone Age to the Middle Ages. The left door represents the Pagan era with Odin as a central figure, while the right door depicts Ansgar and the Christian era. A noted deviation from the historical theme, is the depiction of a standard, 1950s pilsner bottle on the far right side of the right-hand door. A common item with the workers who cast the doors and built the museum. The bottle was chased by Marklund and it is the only part of the bronze surface that has been polished to a shine by people touching it.

== Interior ==
The interior of the museum is spacious with room for both permanent and special exhibitions. The permanent displays are arranged in chronological order in rooms facing the inner courtyard, with the pre-Christian collections on the ground floor and the collections from around 800 onwards upstairs. The halls are constantly updated with adaption to new technology and to accommodate new exhibitions. The entrance hall was refurbished in 1994 to give a modern impression of a medieval knight's hall. The floor was laid with stone and the exposed beams in the ceiling were made of concrete.

=== The Gold Room ===
The Timboholm treasure (Timboholmsskatten), a Migration Period hoard of more than 7 kg of gold discovered near Skövde in 1904. It is the largest surviving gold hoard found in the Nordic region and is now displayed in the Gold Room.

Blasted into the bedrock beneath the central courtyard is the 700 m^{2} (7,500 sq ft) concrete vault known as the Gold Room, where a large number of gold and silver objects are on display. It was built in 1994 and paid for by a donation from the Knut and Alice Wallenberg Foundation. Designed by architect Leif Blomberg, it resembles a mystic cult place with a representation of Mímir's Well in the middle of the exhibition room. The floor and pillars in the room are made of limestone and diabase, and the décor is made from wrought iron. It is accessed through an underground passage from the entrance hall.

The room contains about 3000 objects made from a total of 52 kg (115 lb) gold and more than 200 kg (440 lb) silver. It was only with the heightened security the vault provided, that most of the gold objects could be on display for the general public.

== Collections ==
When Curman originally designed how the collections were to be displayed, he borrowed ideas from contemporary exhibitions, industrial fairs and storefronts. The idea was to entice and educate visitors, something that was met with skepticism from scholars who regarded the museum mainly as a scientific institution. It is one of the largest museums in Sweden with more than 10 million artefacts, registered under around 34,000 inventory numbers, and one of the largest collections of antiquities in Europe. About 6,200 of the objects are on display. In 2011, information about 480,000 of the objects in the museum were accessible through an online database. 65,000 of these entries were illustrated with drawings or photos. The database also contained information about 55,900 places in Sweden where archaeological finds had been made and approximately 267,300 bone finds (total weight about 111 tonnes (245,000 lb)). The database is constantly expanded and updated.

The Vikings collection comprise objects from around 800–1050, including weapons, the Söderala vane, the Mästermyr chest, archaeological finds from the Viking Age trading centre, Birka, a UNESCO World Heritage Site on Björkö, religious items from the era, foreign objects brought home from travels and raids in other parts of the world as well as thousands of finds related to the everyday life during that period.

The most noted objects in the Gold Room collection are the collars dating from around 350–500, made of gold from Roman coins. The room also contains Viking silver jewelry, bejeweled reliquaries from the Middle Ages, coins, ceremonial swords and spoils of war. The large number of preserved objects made from precious metals, is due to a law that was issued in the 17th century, stating that all such finds that were 100 years or older and with no owner, were to be redeemed by the government and sent to the History museum. The law is still in effect.

The museum's collection of Swedish ecclesiastical art is extensive, and its origins span from the 12th century to the post-Reformation period. It contains objects such as wooden sculptures, altarpieces and crucifixes. Among these are the Reliquary of St. Elizabeth and the Viklau Madonna, one of the most well-preserved wooden sculptures from 12th-century Europe.

Textile works from the Middle Ages are kept in the Textile Chamber. The objects are mostly textiles used in churches or by priests and bishops. The oldest and most noted object is a 13th-century tapestry from Skog Church, the Skog tapestry. It was found in 1912, wrapped around a bridal crown. Another tapestry is the Grödinge tapestry.

== Exhibitions ==
The first comprehensive exhibition in the museum opened on 17 April 1943. It was called Ten thousand years in Sweden and comprised exhibitions from the Stone Age to the Middle Ages. The museum has since altered and remade the permanent exhibitions a number of times as well as hosted several new special exhibitions on an annual basis. These are often related to some topic that is currently under debate or otherwise current. Some of the special exhibitions were:

- Luxury products and unique portraits, 1997, exports from the Roman Empire to Scandinavia.
- Snow White and The Madness of Truth, 2004, an art installation that lead to an international controversy.
- Save History!, 2009, on how global warming and pollution destroys the cultural heritage.
- Boundless – a global voyage of discovery, 2011, about how different cultures have met and influenced each other throughout history.
- Three centuries of friendship between Russia and the Netherlands, 2013, with objects on loan from museums, archives and libraries in Russia and the Netherlands.
- Hidden stories, 2015, an exhibition interwoven in the permanent exhibitions with notes and stories highlighting sexuality and gender identity by providing an alternate view on history.

In 2010, a new permanent exhibition called Sweden's History opened. It highlights personal items connected with milestones and turning points in Swedish history during the last 1000 years. In 2011, the museum created its first turnkey exhibition We call them Vikings in cooperation with Austrian MuseumsPartner and Studio Exhibit. The two-parts exhibition showcase other aspects of Viking life than that of stereotype barbarian raiders. As of 2015, it has toured a number of venues in Europe and North America.

== Gallery ==
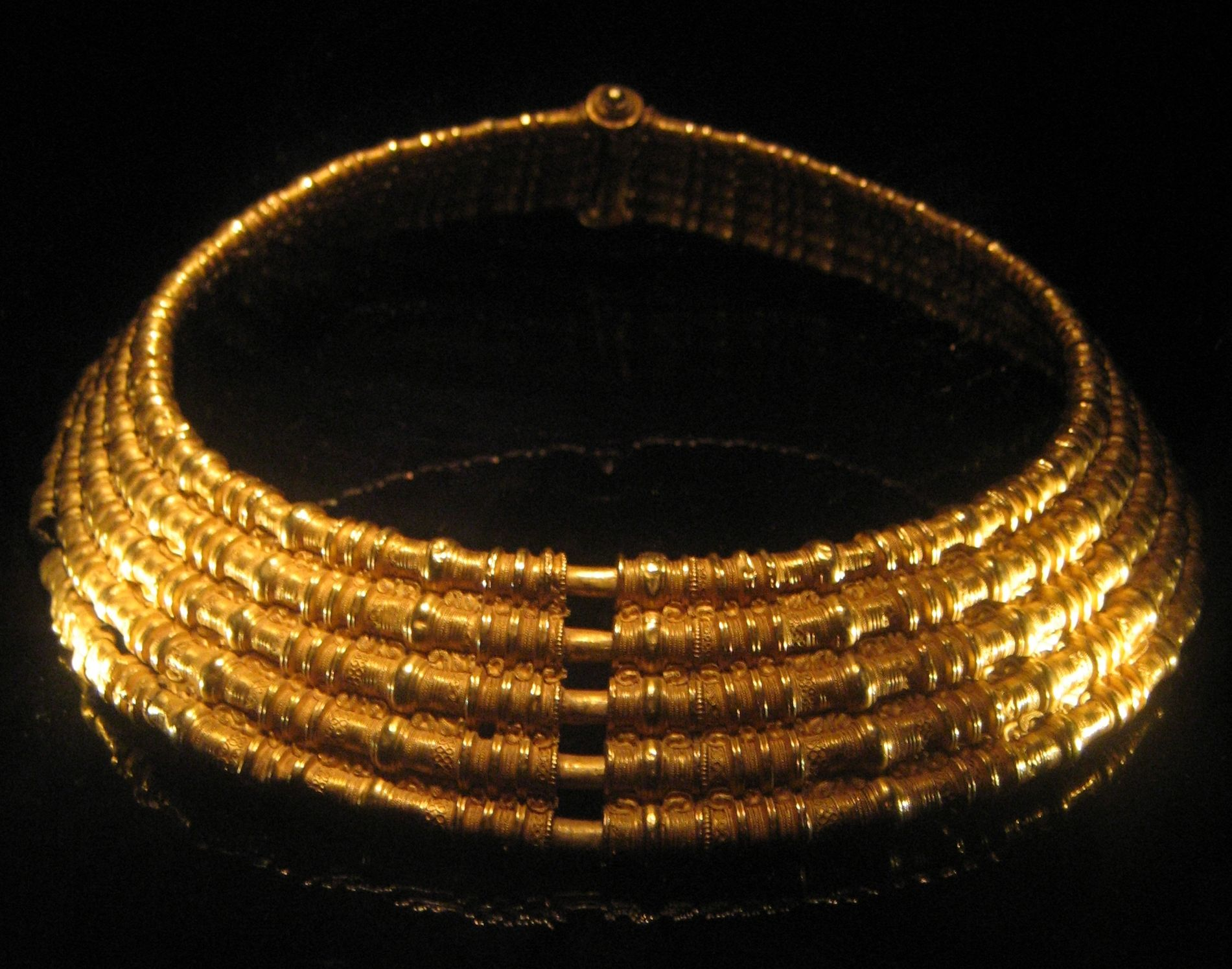
Golden necklace from Färjestaden, one of the objects in the Gold Room

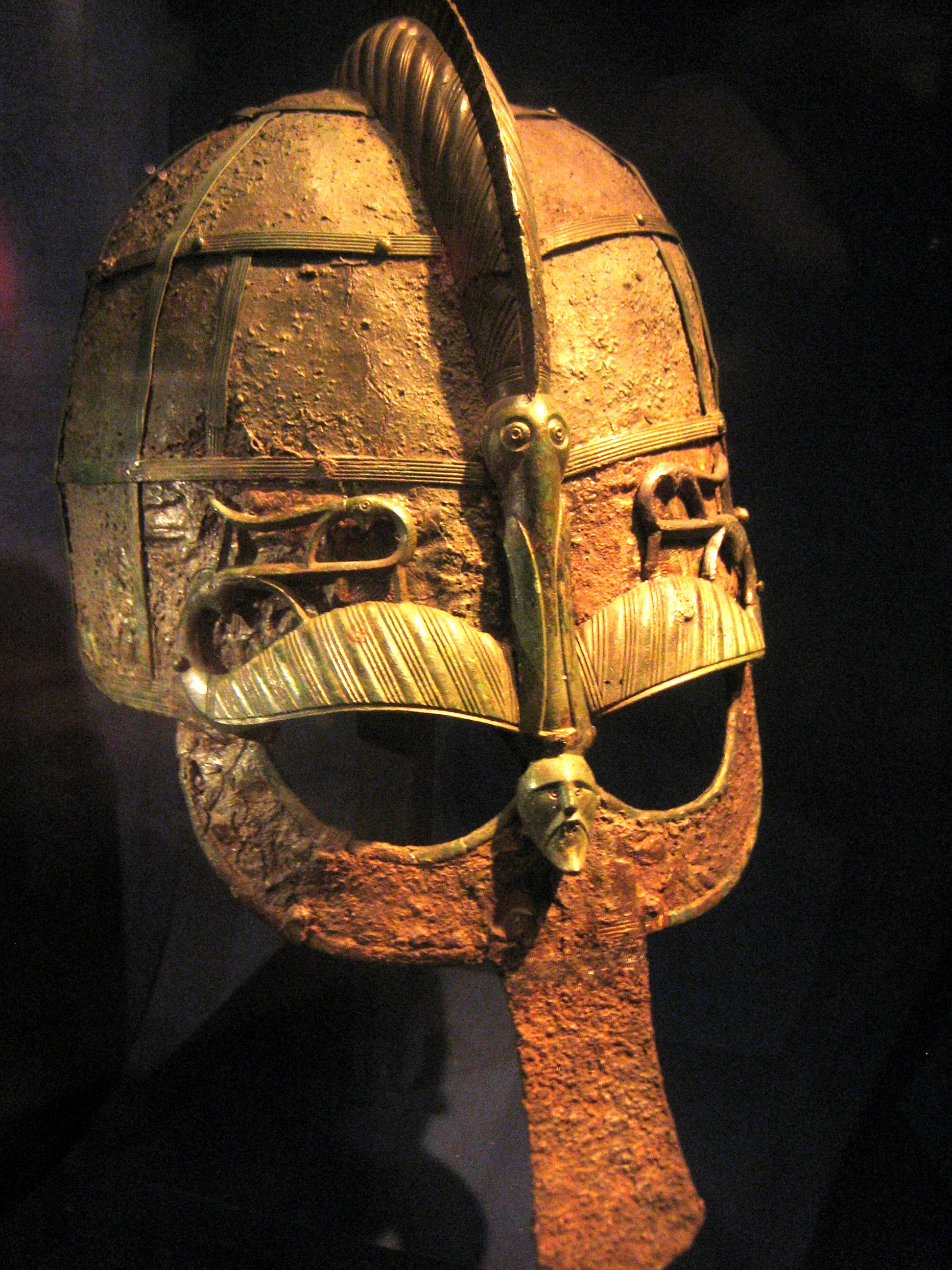
The Vendel I helmet, a 7th-century iron helmet with bronze fittings from a boat grave at Vendel, Uppland.

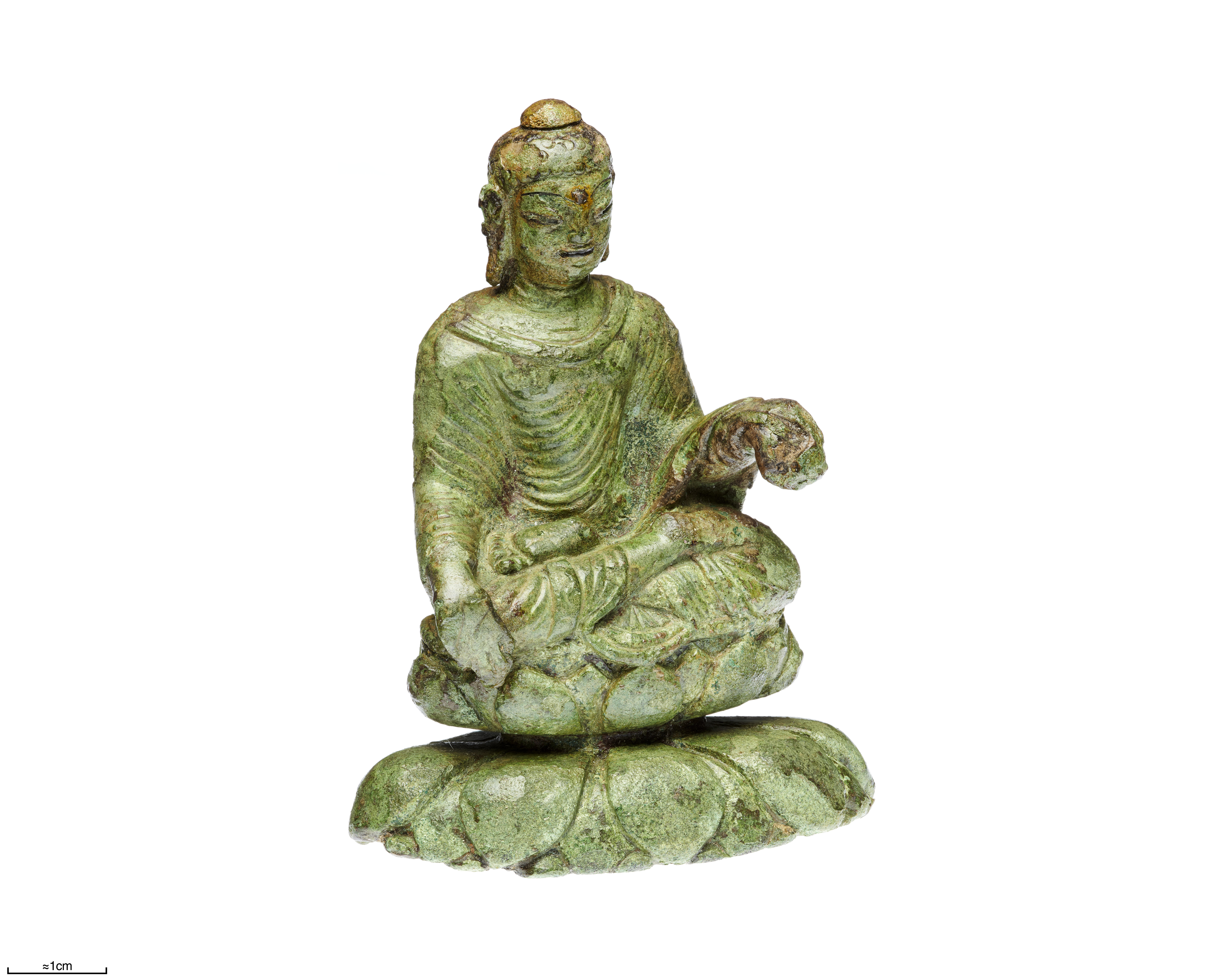
The Helgö Buddha, a bronze statuette made in the late 5th or early 6th century, probably in the Swat Valley, and later found at Helgö in Sweden.

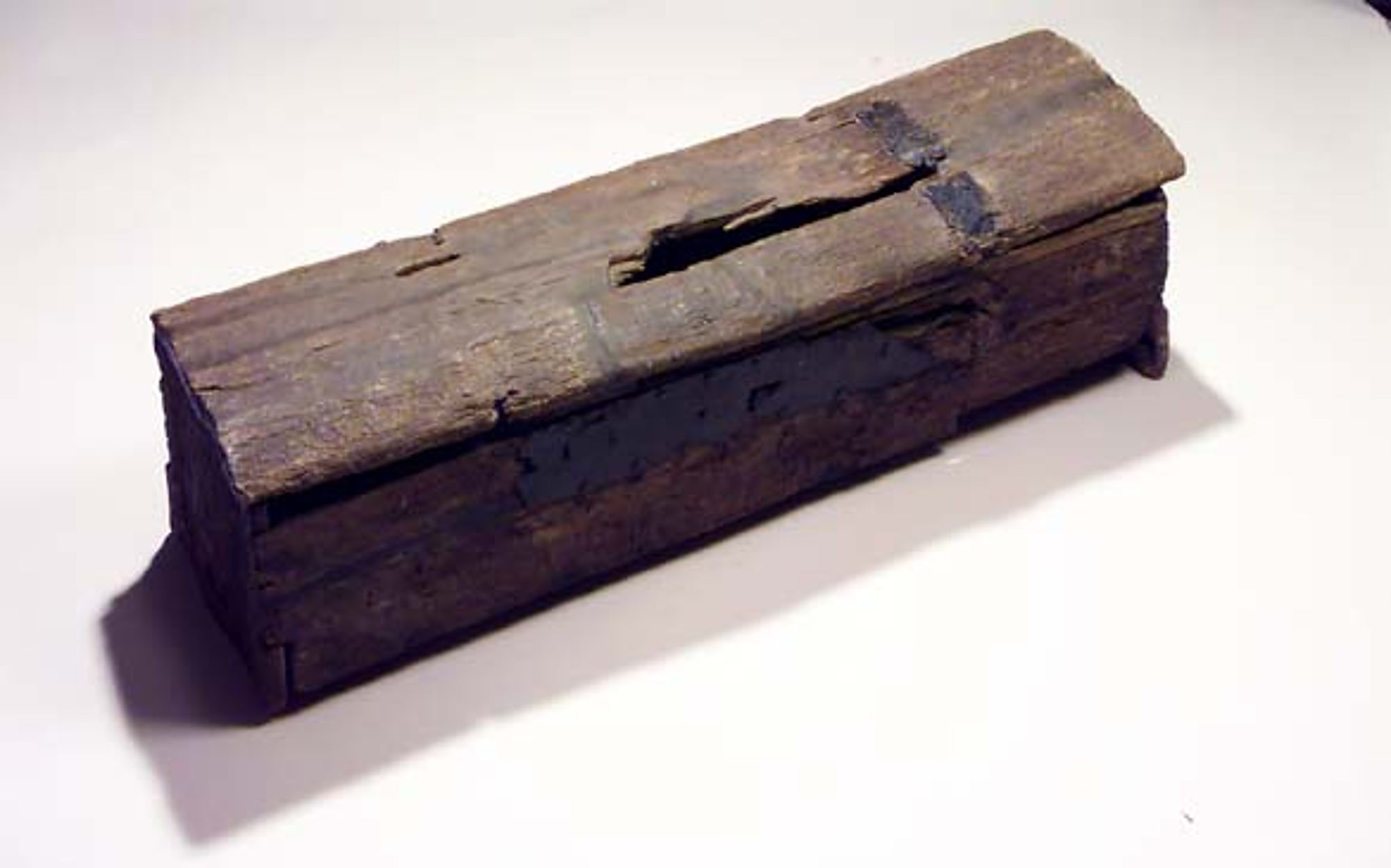
The Mästermyr chest, a Viking Age tool chest discovered on Gotland, containing a large collection of iron tools.

The Reliquary of St. Elizabeth, a medieval reliquary associated with Saint Elizabeth of Hungary.

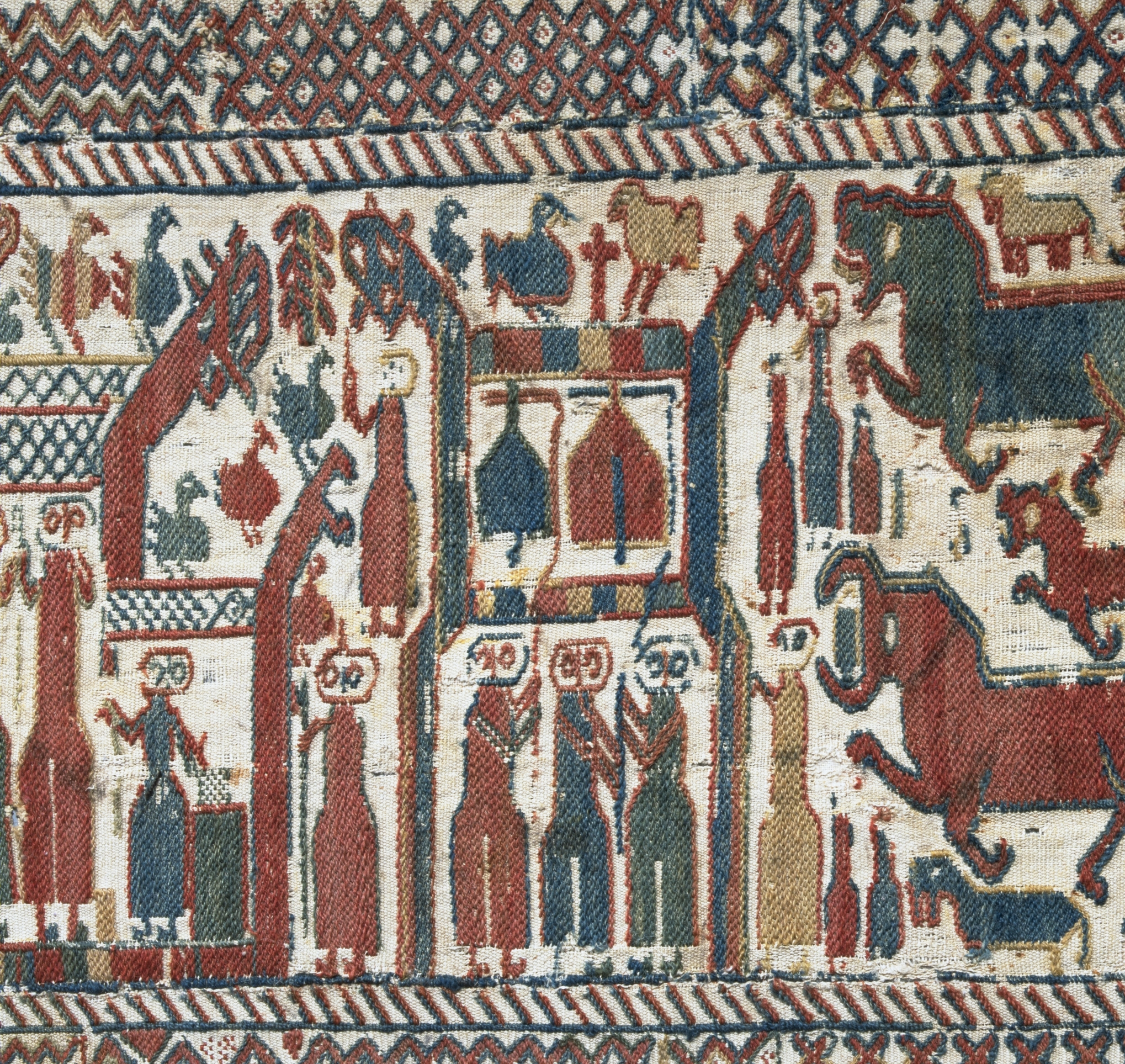
Part of the Skog tapestry

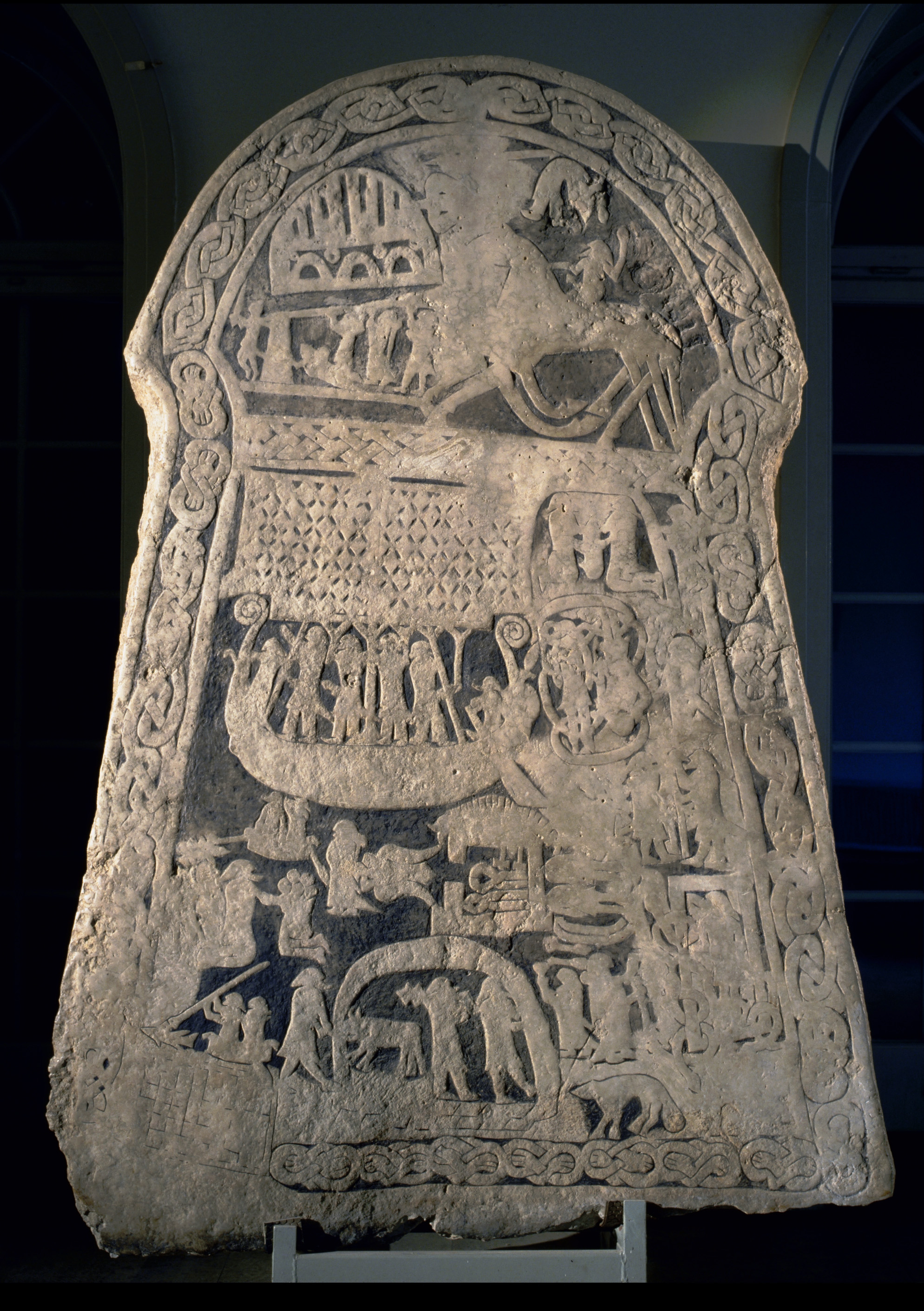
Prehistoric picture stone showing figures from Norse mythology

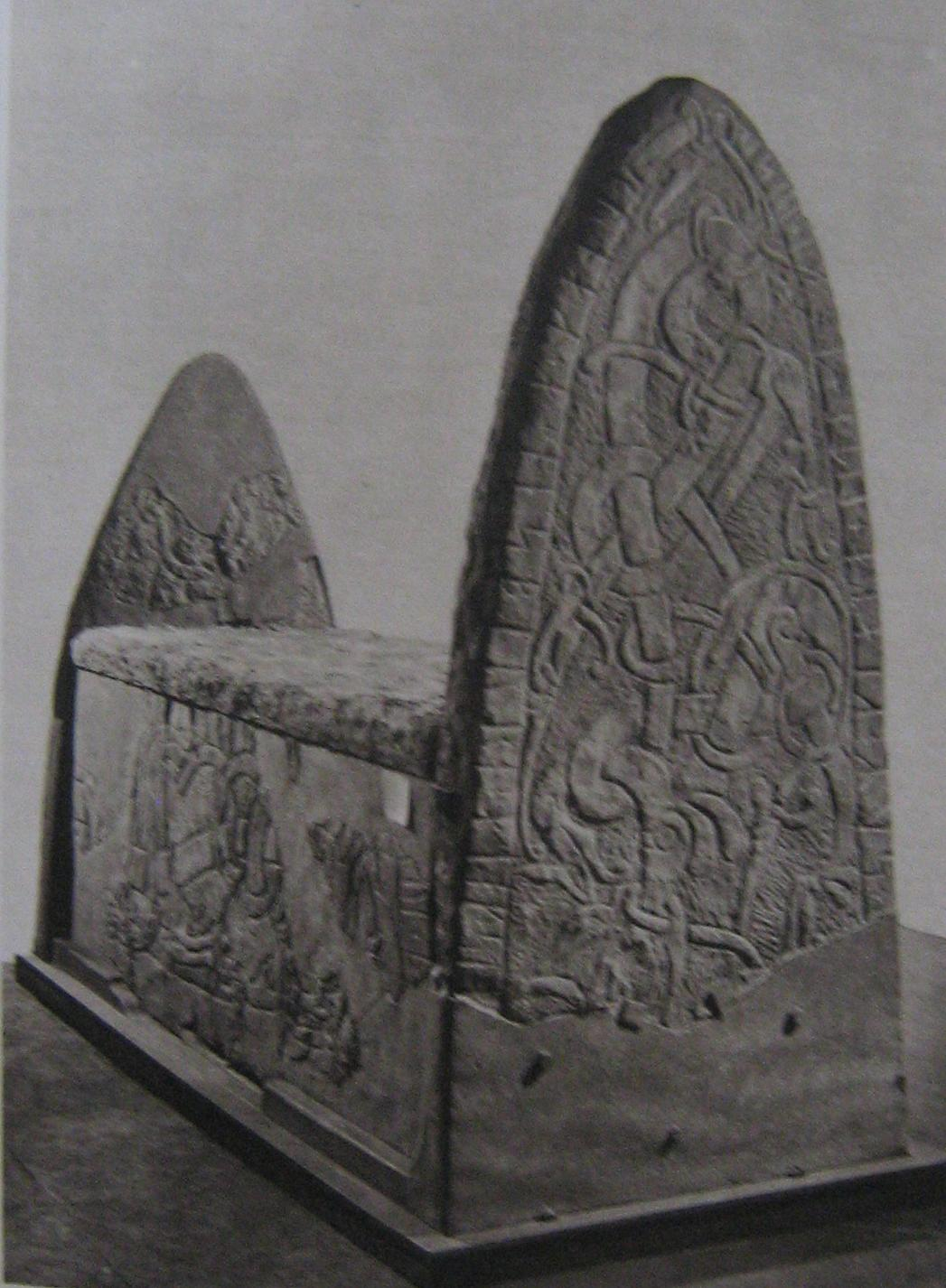
Eskilstunakista, a late 11th-century stone coffin

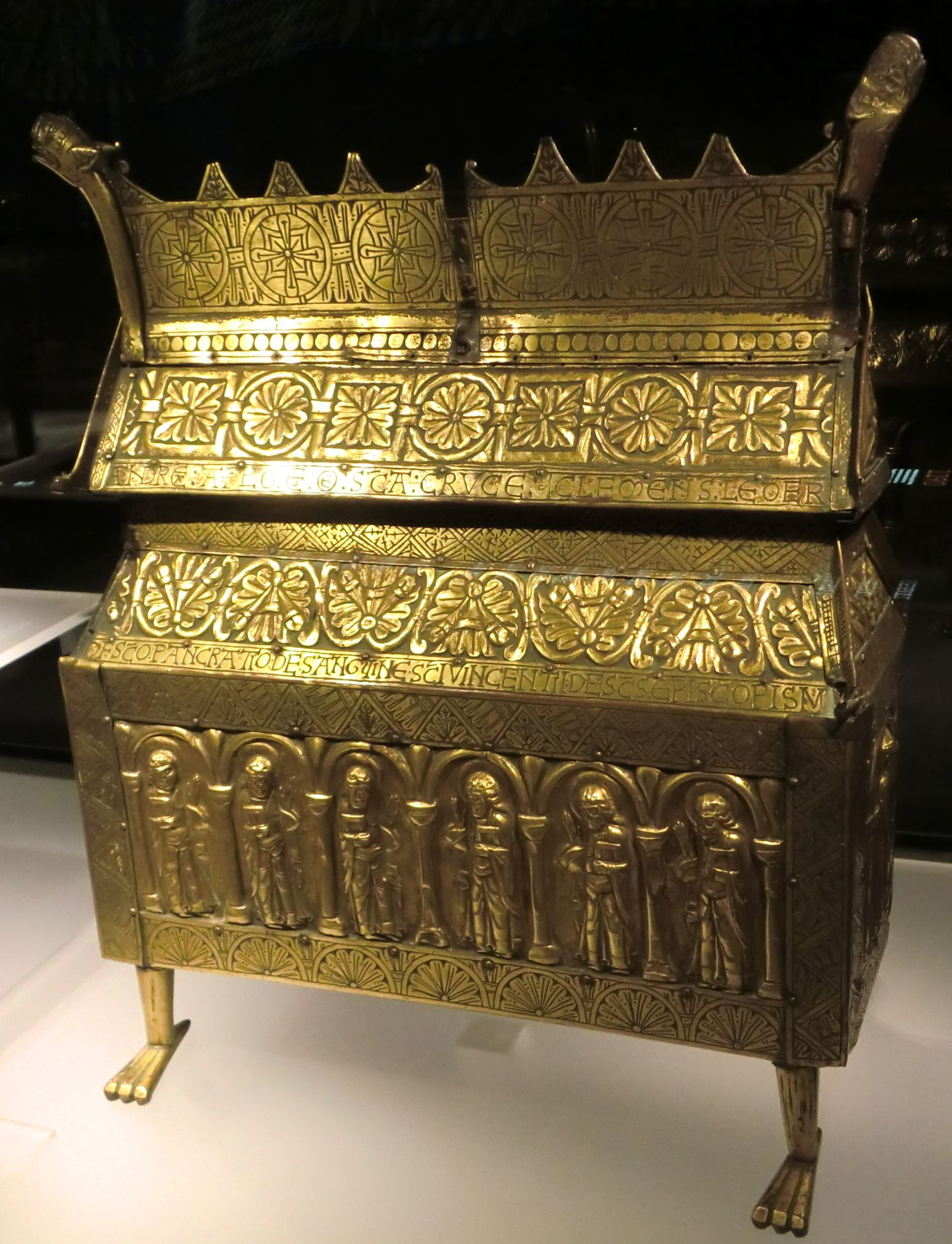
Wooden reliquary from Eriksberg Church, Västergötland

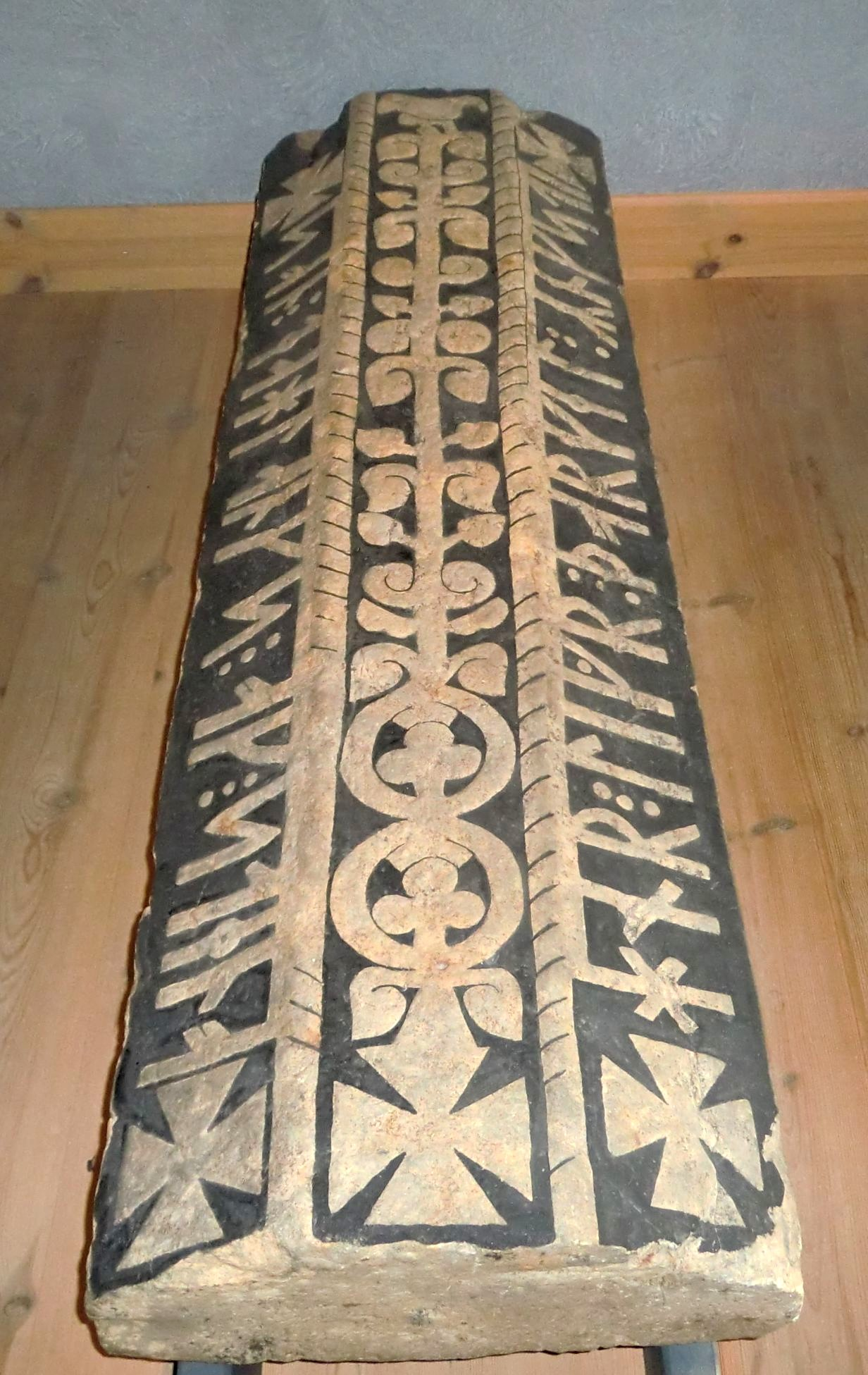
13th-century stone with Runic text from Näs Church, Västergötland, translating as: "Here lies Torkel, Daglångs, and Stenas youngest son."

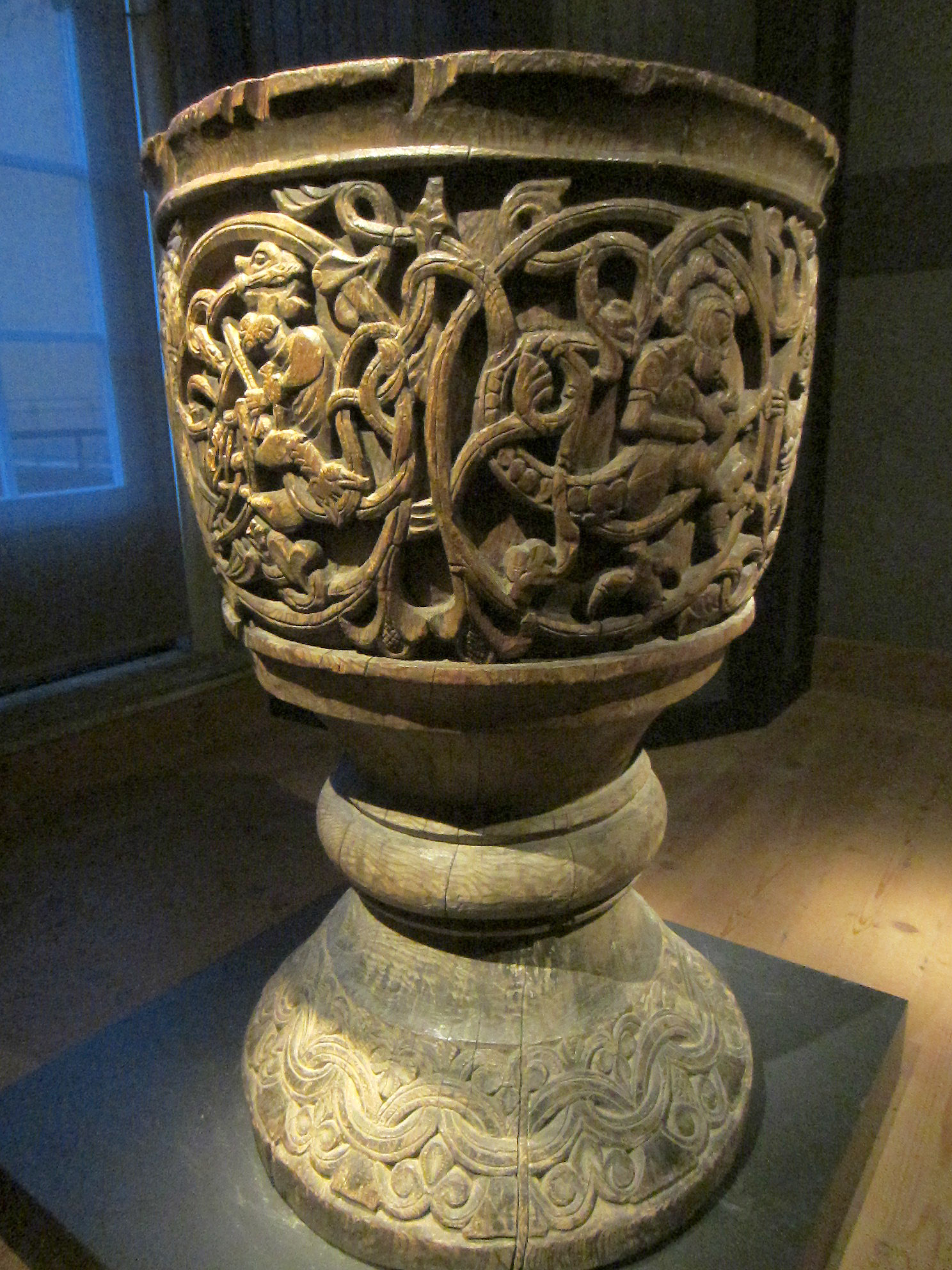
Medieval baptismal font from Näs Church

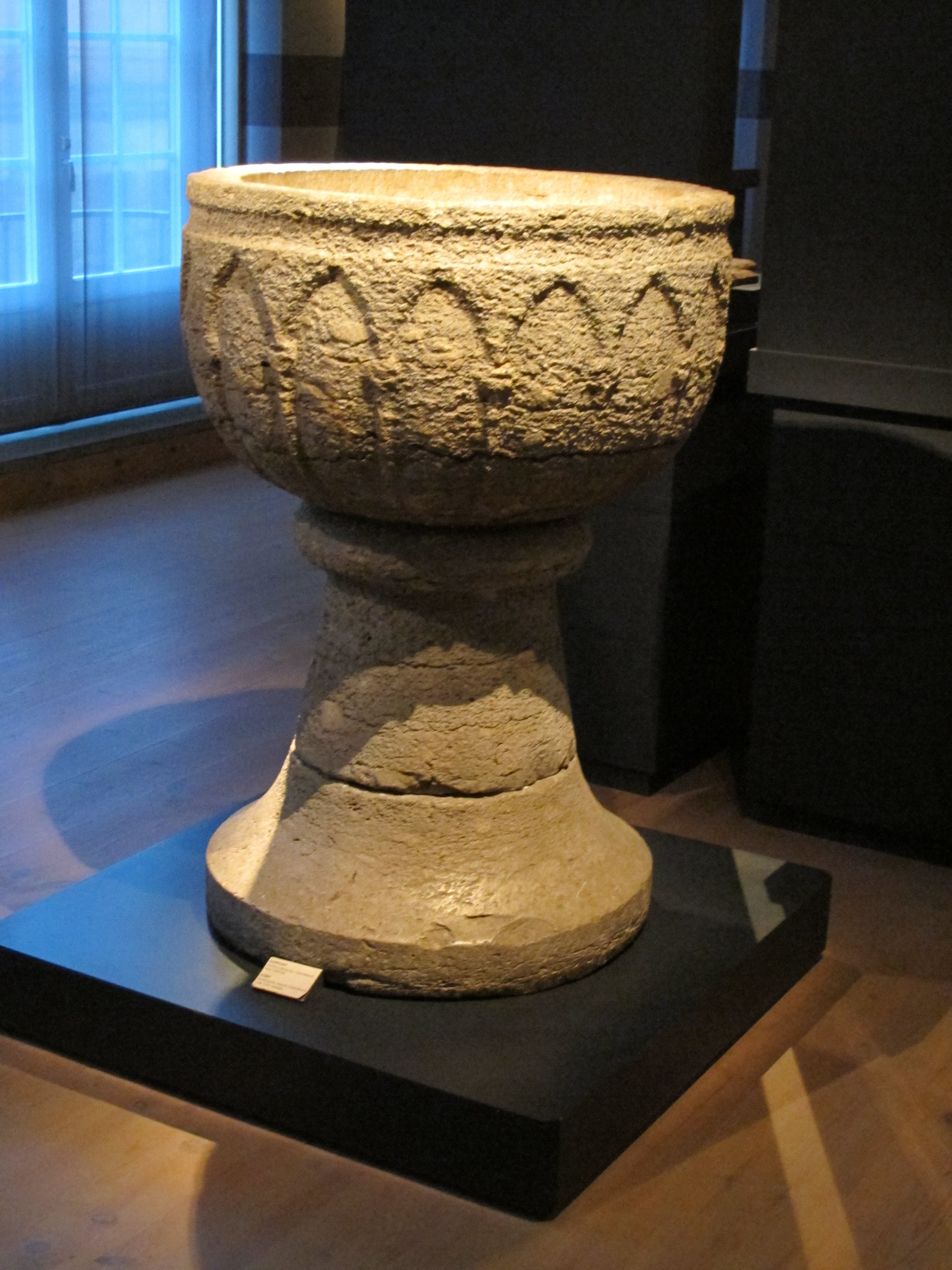
Hedesunda Church font, late 13th century

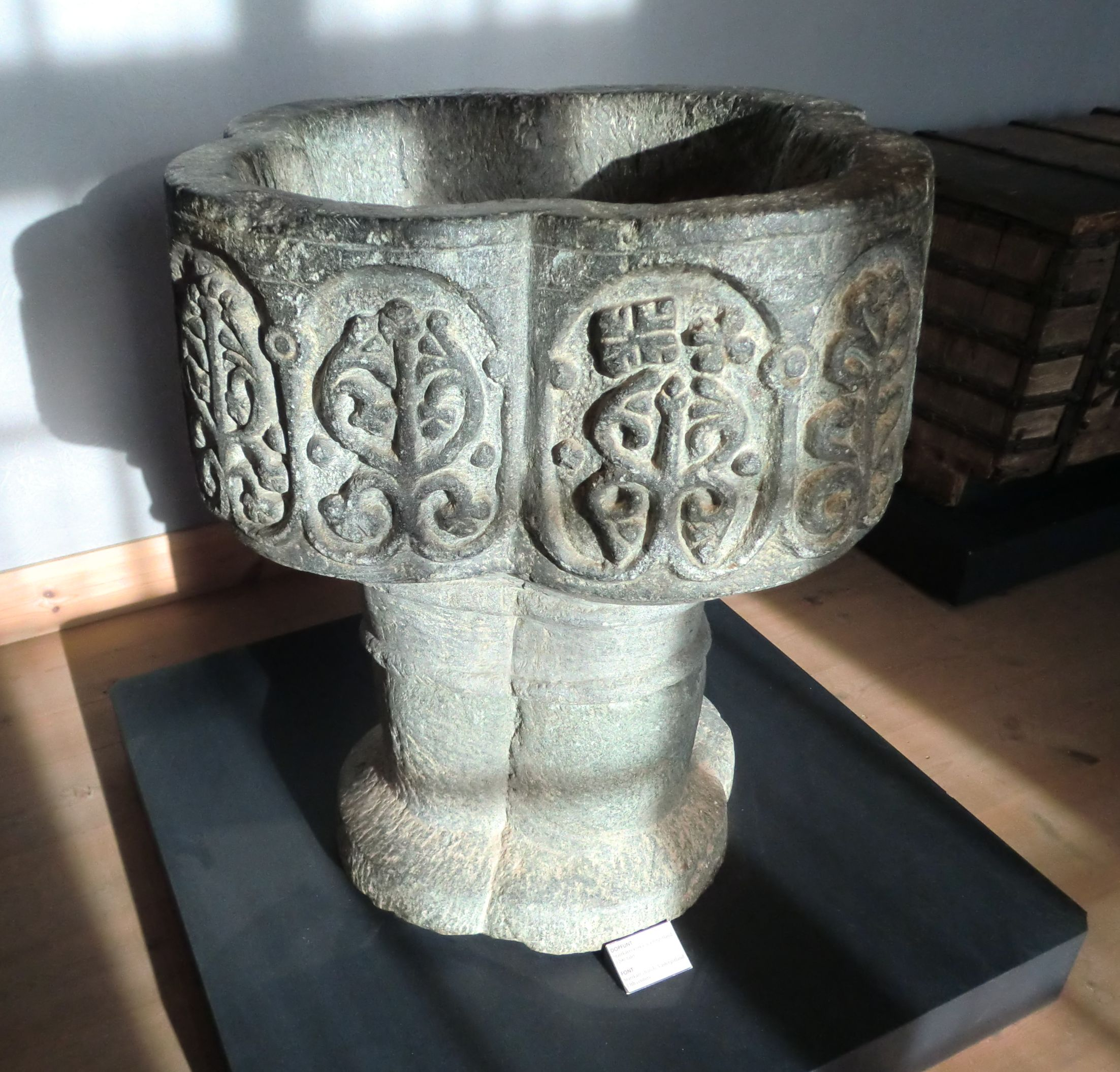
Baptismal font from Starrkärr Church, Västergötland

== See also ==
- List of museums in Stockholm
- List of runestones
- Culture in Stockholm
- Gotland Museum
- Museum of Medieval Stockholm
