= Skog tapestry =

The Skog tapestry (Swedish: Skogbonaden or Skogtapeten) is a medieval textile work of art which was discovered in Skog Church in Sweden in 1912. Its subject matter remains a topic of discussion. The tapestry is presently housed in the Swedish History Museum in Stockholm.

== History ==
The tapestry was discovered in 1912 by Frans Rodenstam and Erik Salvén, who were on a tour of churches in Hälsingland looking for textile church art for an exhibition. At the time, the tapestry was used as a cloth and was wrapped around a bridal crown in the attic of Skog Church. It was in a poor shape and was sent for conservation to Stockholm, where it was professionally treated by Agnes Branting. It is presently kept at the Swedish History Museum in Stockholm. Using radiocarbon dating, researchers have concluded that the tapestry was made sometime between 1240 and 1410, and most probably during the late 13th century. The original location of the tapestry is unknown; a chapel was built in Skog only in 1324.

== Description ==
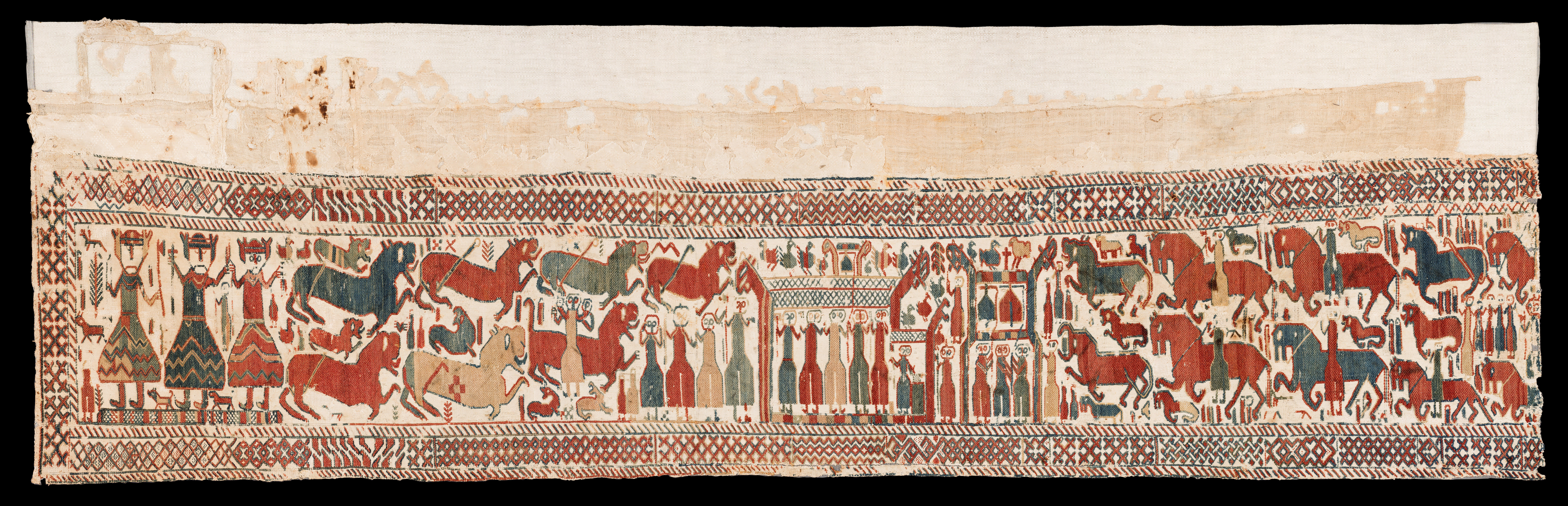
The Skog tapestry in full, a 13th-century Swedish textile now held at the Swedish History Museum.

The tapestry is made of a mixture of linen and wool and woven in soumak technique; it is one of the last examples of soumak weaving technique in medieval Swedish textile art. Approximately 15 centimetres (5.9 in) of the original tapestry's right side has been lost.

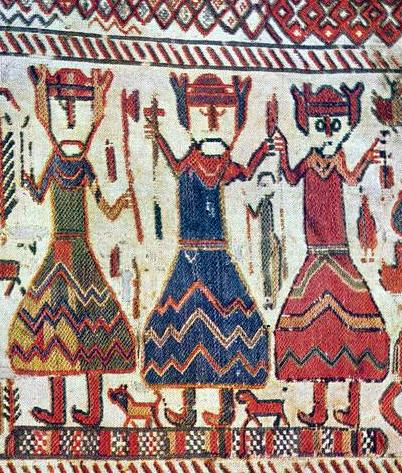
Detail with three prominent figures; it remains unclear what they represent

The subject matter that the tapestry depicts has been lively discussed. Notably, it is the depiction of three prominent figures that has caused debate. One theory posits that they are representations of the three Nordic saint-kings Saint Olaf, Saint Eric and Saint Canute. Another theory is that they are representing the three Norse divinities Odin, Thor and Freyr, on account that one of the figures, like Odin, is lacking one eye. Later research has however concluded that the missing eye has simply been lost by wear and all three figures originally had two eyes. There is also a central structure in the tapestry which possibly depicts a church, which would rule out a pagan subject matter. Other interpretations have been that the three figures represent the Magi or the Trinity. The subject matter of the tapestry as a whole has been interpreted by some as a depiction of the struggle between paganism and Christianity.

The tapestry displays many similarities with the older Överhogdal tapestries.

== See also ==
- Grödinge tapestry
- Överhogdal tapestries
