= Jamtli =

Open air museum in Östersund, Sweden

Coordinates: 63.18777°N 14.63683°E

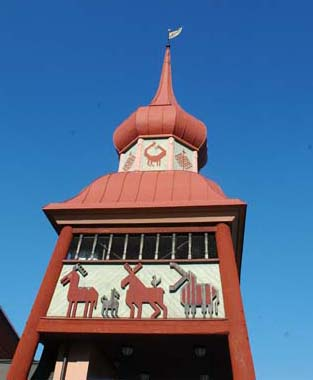
Belltower of Jamtli (Klockstapel) inspired by characteristic feature in 18th century church architecture in Jämtland

Jamtli is the name of the regional open air museum of Jämtland and Härjedalen in Östersund, Sweden. It consists of an open-air museum with historical buildings, and an indoor museum with both permanent and temporary exhibitions. “Jamtli” literally means “hillside of Jämtland” in the local dialect. Since the 1980s, the museum has been working with living history in a project entitled Jamtli Historyland. This venture has contributed to make the museum one of the most popular tourist attractions in the region.

== History ==
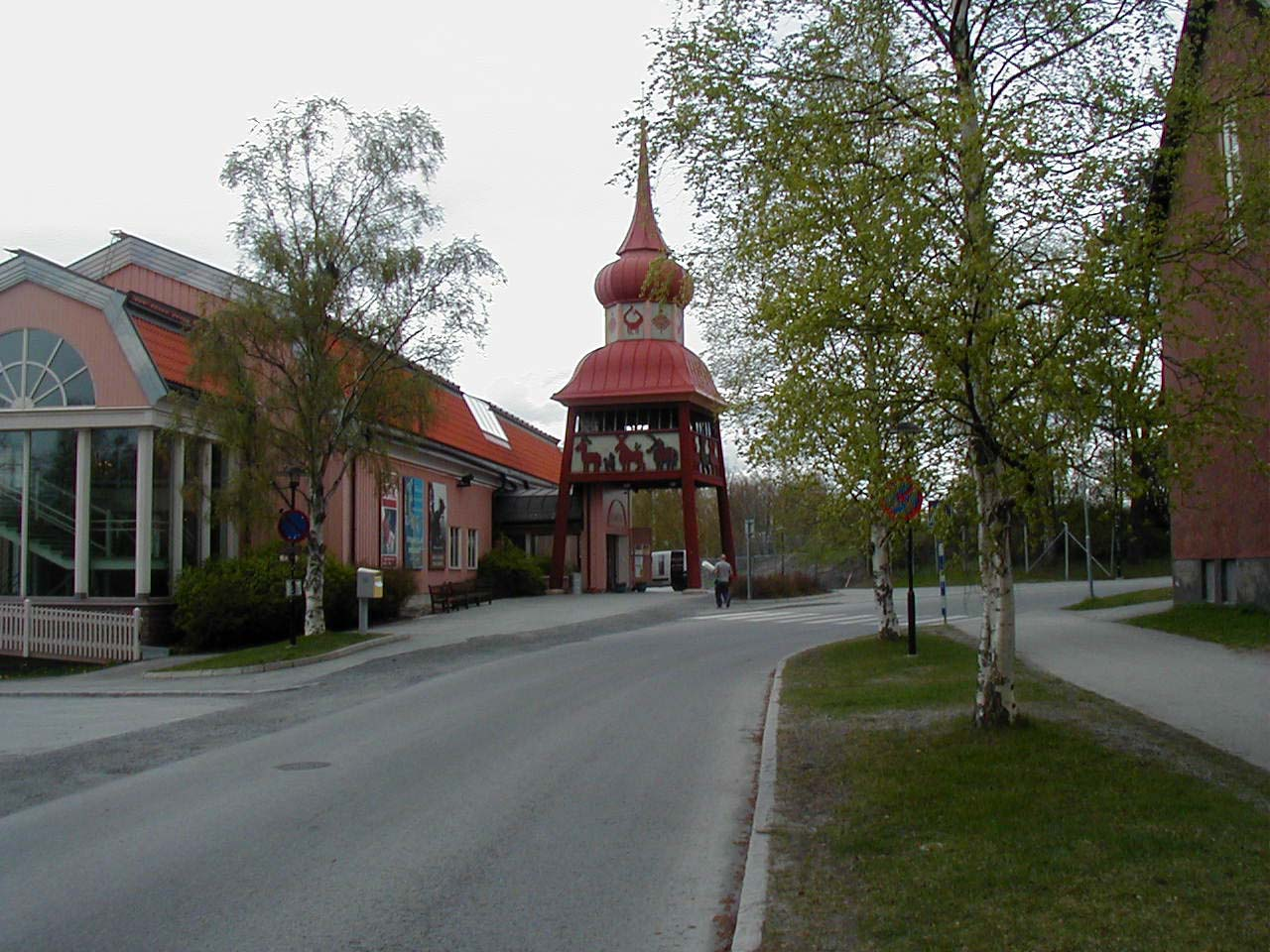
Main entrance to Jamtli

Jamtli has its roots in the antiquarian association of Jämtland, established in 1886. After years of preparations led by the County Governor’s wife sv:Ellen Widén, the open-air museum was inaugurated in 1912, and sv:Eric Festin was appointed as its first director. In the early years, the museum focused on collecting and exhibiting historical buildings and items, but also organized courses in folk dance, handicraft and music. The aim was to keep alive traditions that were sinking into oblivion in the wake of industrialisation. The ideological background for the project can be found in the National Romanticism that flourished in Europe in the 19th century. Since 1913, the museum edits the yearbook Jämten.

In the late 1920s, construction of a proper museum was commenced. Until then, collections were exhibited in the historical buildings and on various other locations in town. The new museum was stylistically inspired by the castle architecture of the Vasa-era of the 16th century, and its grandeur testifies to the importance attributed to regional cultural heritage at the time. It opened to the public in 1930, with exhibitions of textiles and archaeological finds, ethnographic artefacts and art. The famous Överhogdal tapestries from the Viking era were the main attractions. During the 1930s, the archaeologist, feminist and County Governor’s wife Hanna Rydh played an important part in the development of the museum, taking special interest in traditional costumes of the region.

In 1953, one began to arrange Wednesday dances in the open-air grounds. The dances became highly popular, and went on every summer until 1979. In the beginning, this event attracted a family audience, but over the years, it became more youth-oriented. This had unfortunate side effects. The grounds deteriorated, and at a certain stage, historical buildings had to be fenced off from the crowd with barbed wire. Towards the late 60s, the need for a thorough restoration of both buildings and activities was clearly visible. The ethnologist Göran Rosander was appointed new director in 1967. He managed to attract more visitors to the museum with a steady flow of new exhibitions, and he also initiated various ethnological surveys in the region.

In 1971, Sten Rentzhog succeeded Rosander. At the time, alternative learning methods and new thoughts on the museum’s role in society were spreading. Items and buildings should not be dead relics anymore; they were to be incorporated into the daily activities at the museum. At Jamtli, the new ideas sparked a vitalization. Since 1986, actors have moved into the historical buildings every summer, and recreated how people lived, worked and spoke in the past. Jamtli Historyland (Jamtli Historieland) has been the summer season’s main attraction, and has inspired a similar period of activities named Jamtli Winterland in February–March.

== Jamtli today ==
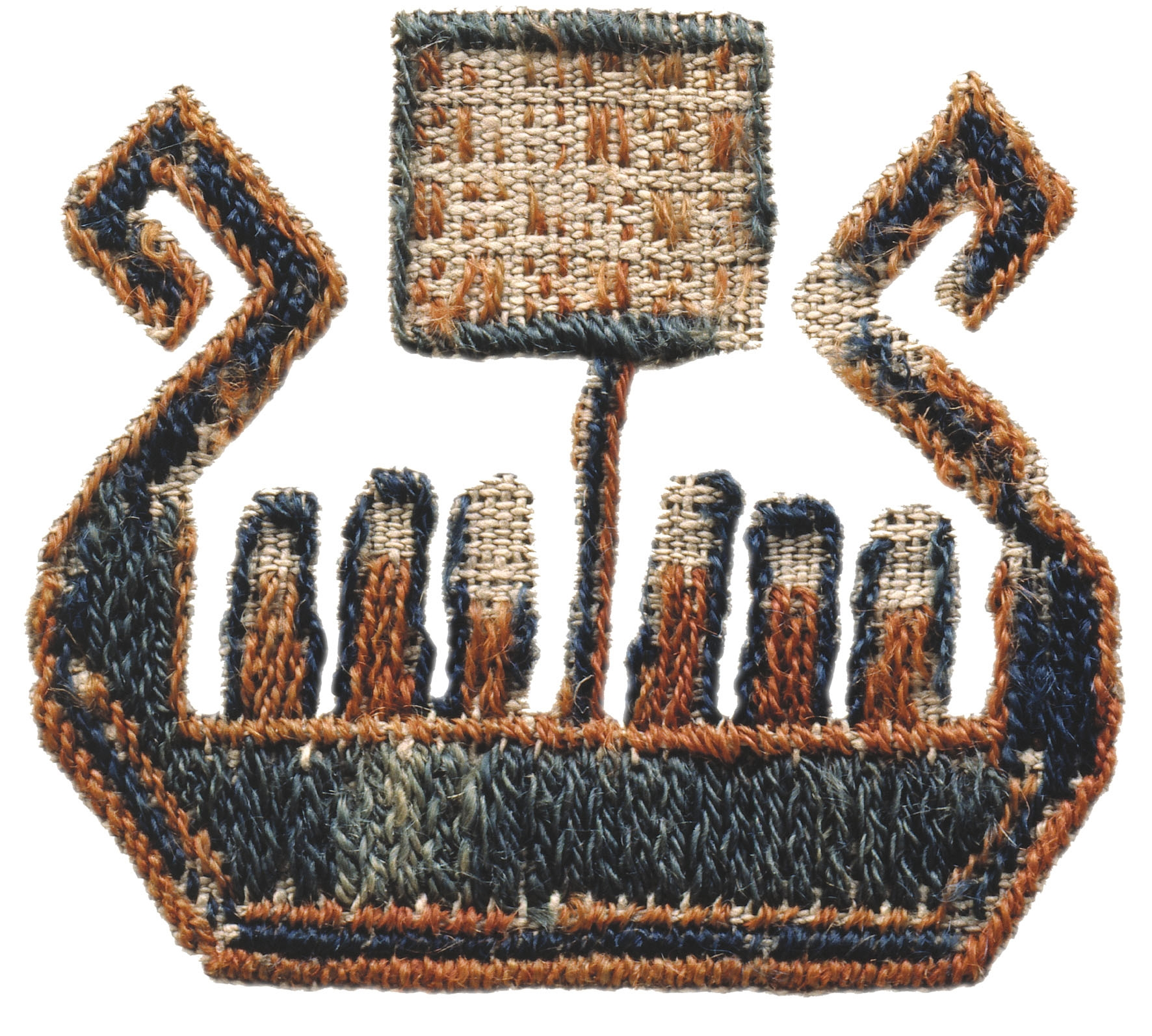
Överhogdal tapestries

In 1990, construction of a new museum with modern facilities was begun. Five years later, the building opened to the public, with a series of new exhibitions showing the cultural history of Jämtland-Härjedalen. The older building today houses offices, archives, a library, and one of the country’s largest collections of historical photography, as well as departments of archaeology and building preservation.

The museum exhibition hosts an interesting set of tapestries, the Överhogdal tapestries, showing a rich imagery of both Norse and Christian origin from the Viking Age. The mythical Great Lake Monster (Storsjöodjuret) has an exhibit of its own.

In 2002, Henrik Zip Sane followed Rentzhog as director. Under his leadership, a stronger European perspective has been developed alongside the regional approach. Jamtli today takes part in a number of projects with partners from all over Europe. Jamtli has been awarded several prizes in recent years, including the Great Tourism Prize (Stora Turismpriset) in 2000 and the national Children’s Tourist Prize (Barnens Turistpris) in 2006.

== See also ==
- Nordic Centre of Heritage Learning
