= Grödinge tapestry =

Grödingebonaden

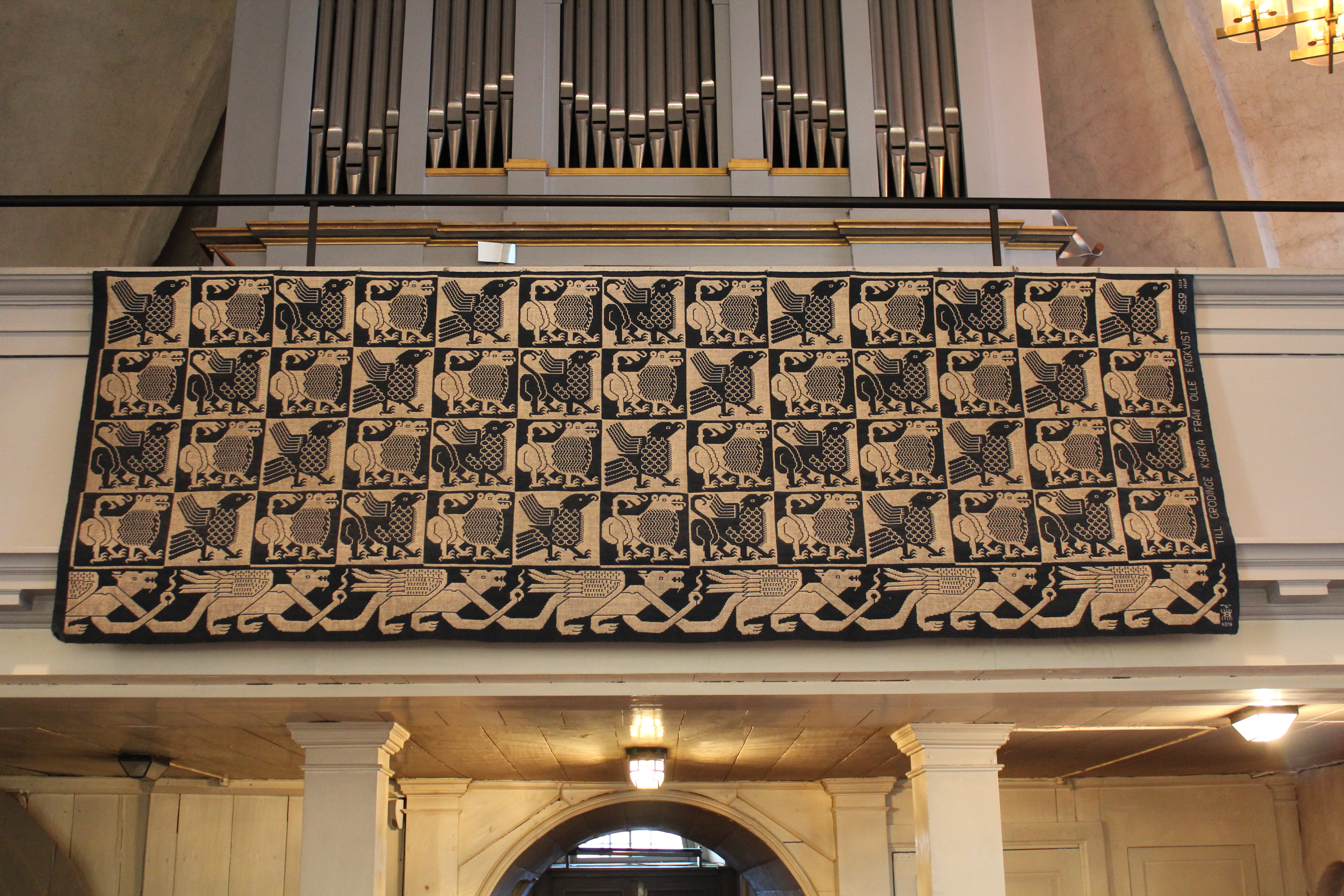
Replica of Grödingebonaden at Grödinge Church

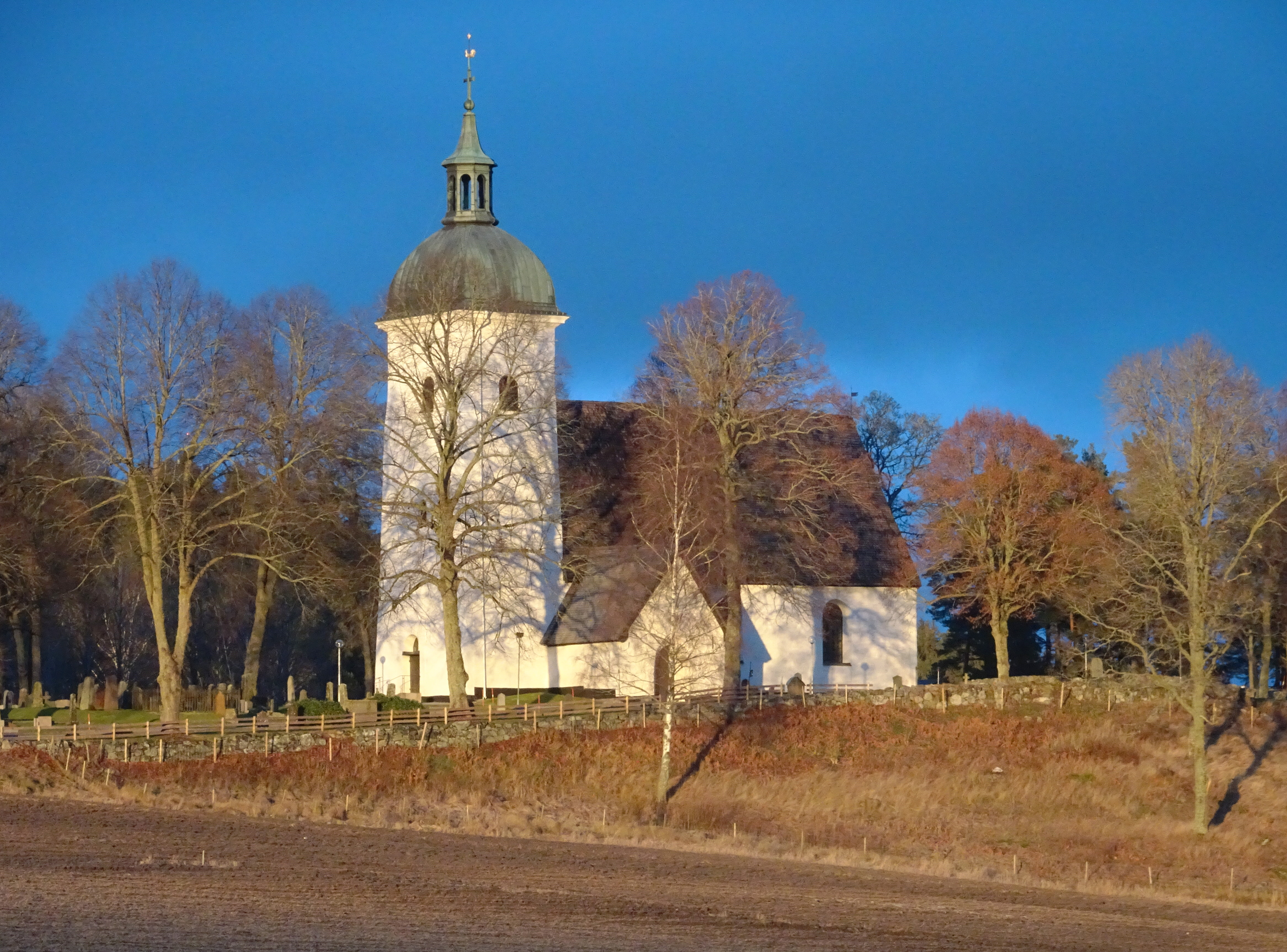
12th century Romanesque Grödinge Church in Södermanland

Grödinge tapestry (Swedish: Grödingebonaden) is a type of handwoven tapestry that is on display at the Swedish History Museum in Stockholm, Sweden. It originates from the Grödinge Church (Grödinge kyrka) in the Diocese of Strängnäs at Botkyrka Municipality in Södermanland County, Sweden. The tapestry was donated to the Swedish History Museum in 1910.

== History ==
The weave has been dated to the 15th century. The tapestry is made in a weaving technique called double cloth (finnväv), and it has a symmetrical square pattern in blue and white with lions, griffins and eagles or falcons, as well as dragons along the lower edge. All animals are depicted in profile and in the same direction. The dragons along the lower part of the tapestry are linked to each other with their long tails.

The patterns on the Grödinge tapestry have been associated to patterns from Byzantium, with clear traces of Scandinavian influences. The Grödinge tapestry consists of two lengths, of which one has remaining edges which shows the weave width to be about 85 cm (33 in). The original length for both the tapestries is unknown.

The tapestry is made of wool. It stands out for great technical finesse and clear composition, representing the transition between the early medieval textiles made in double cloth and the later ones with strong renaissance elements. A simpler version from Sankt Mårten in the National Museum of Finland in Helsinki. Other tapestries of the same kind have been found in Södra Råda and Överenhörna in Sweden, and at Rauma, Finland.

In 1971, the Swedish postal service issued two stamps featuring motifs from the tapestry: a lion and a griffin.

== See also ==
- Överhogdal tapestries
- Skog tapestry
