= Nordic Centre of Heritage Learning =

The Nordic Heritage Learning Centre (NCK) is a joint Nordic initiative, developing and promoting the lifelong learning processes at the cultural heritage institutions in the Nordic countries. NCK is a meeting ground and a forum where students and other interest groups can search for information, exchange ideas and thoughts and establish new contacts.

NCK is based in Östersund, Sweden and run jointly by Jamtli, the Föreningsarkivet (the Popular Movement Archive) in Jämtland county, and the Landsarkivet (the Regional Archives) in Östersund.
