= Eskilstunakista =

Christian grave monuments in Sweden

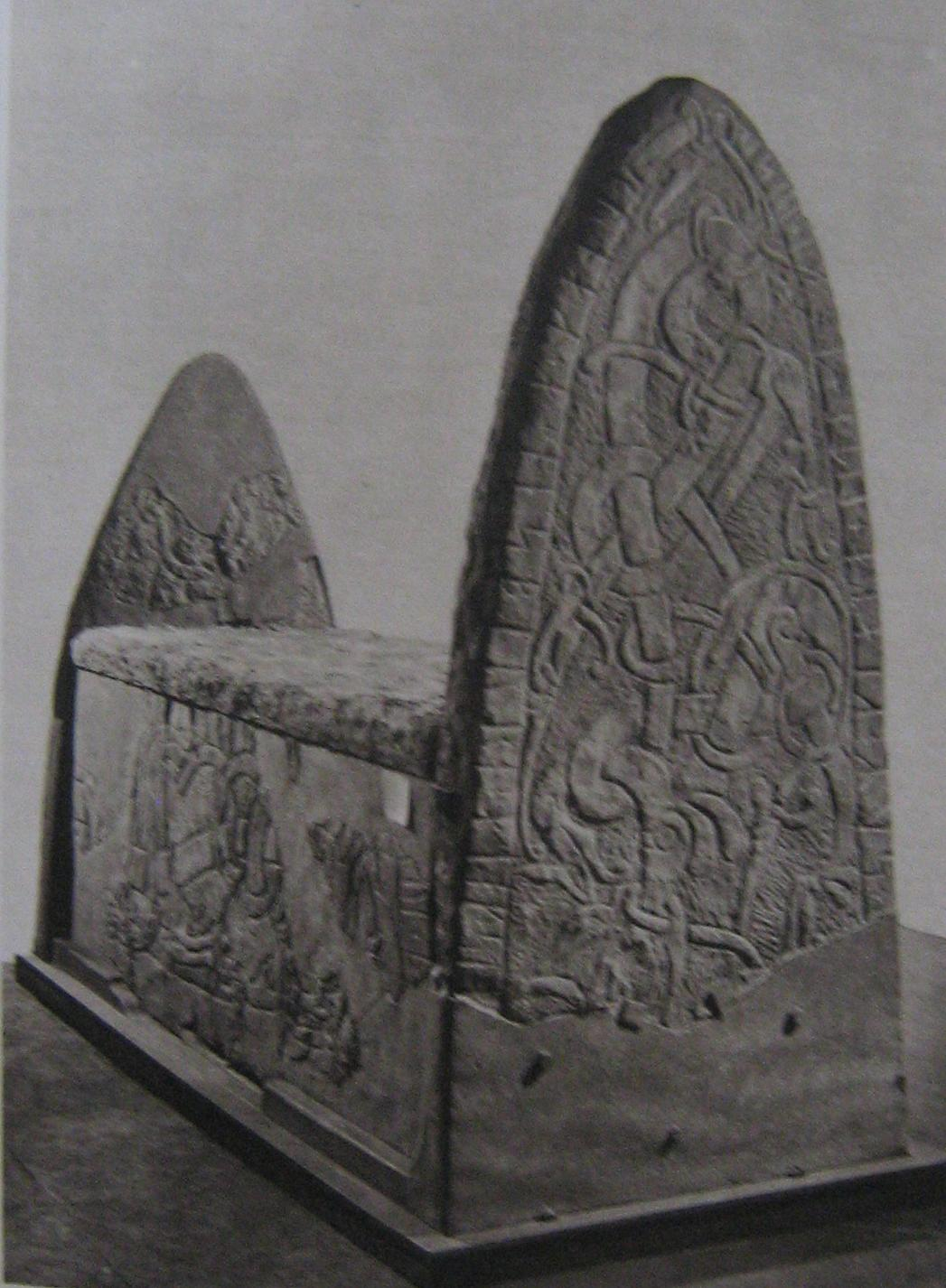
Eskilstunakista. This coffin, dated to the later half of the 11'th century, executed by the stonemason Näsbjörn and the runestone carver Tove, is the source of the coffins' names. This coffin which was found in 1912 in Eskilstuna is today in the Swedish History Museum.

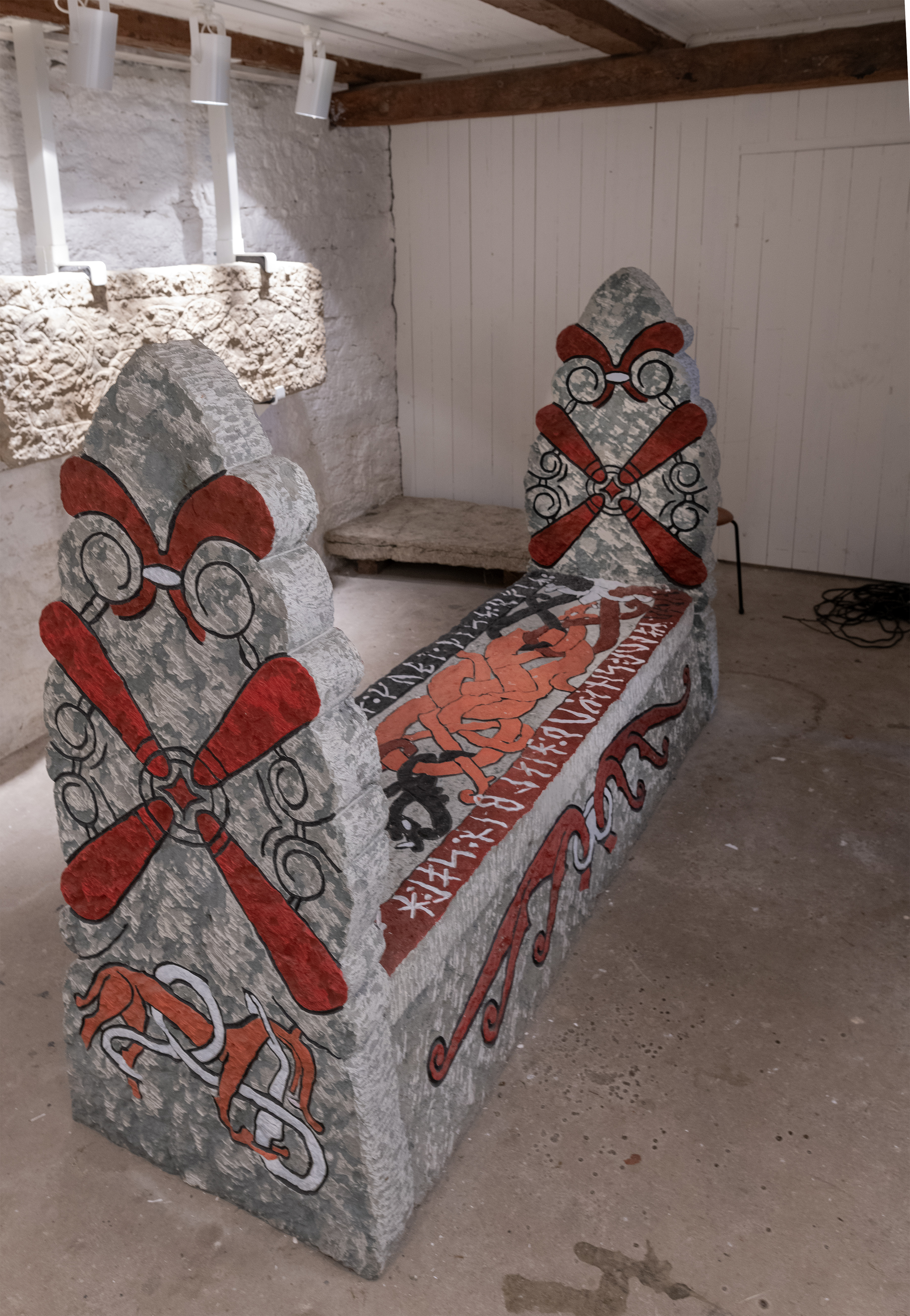
Reconstructed coffin in a small museum at Örberga kyrka.

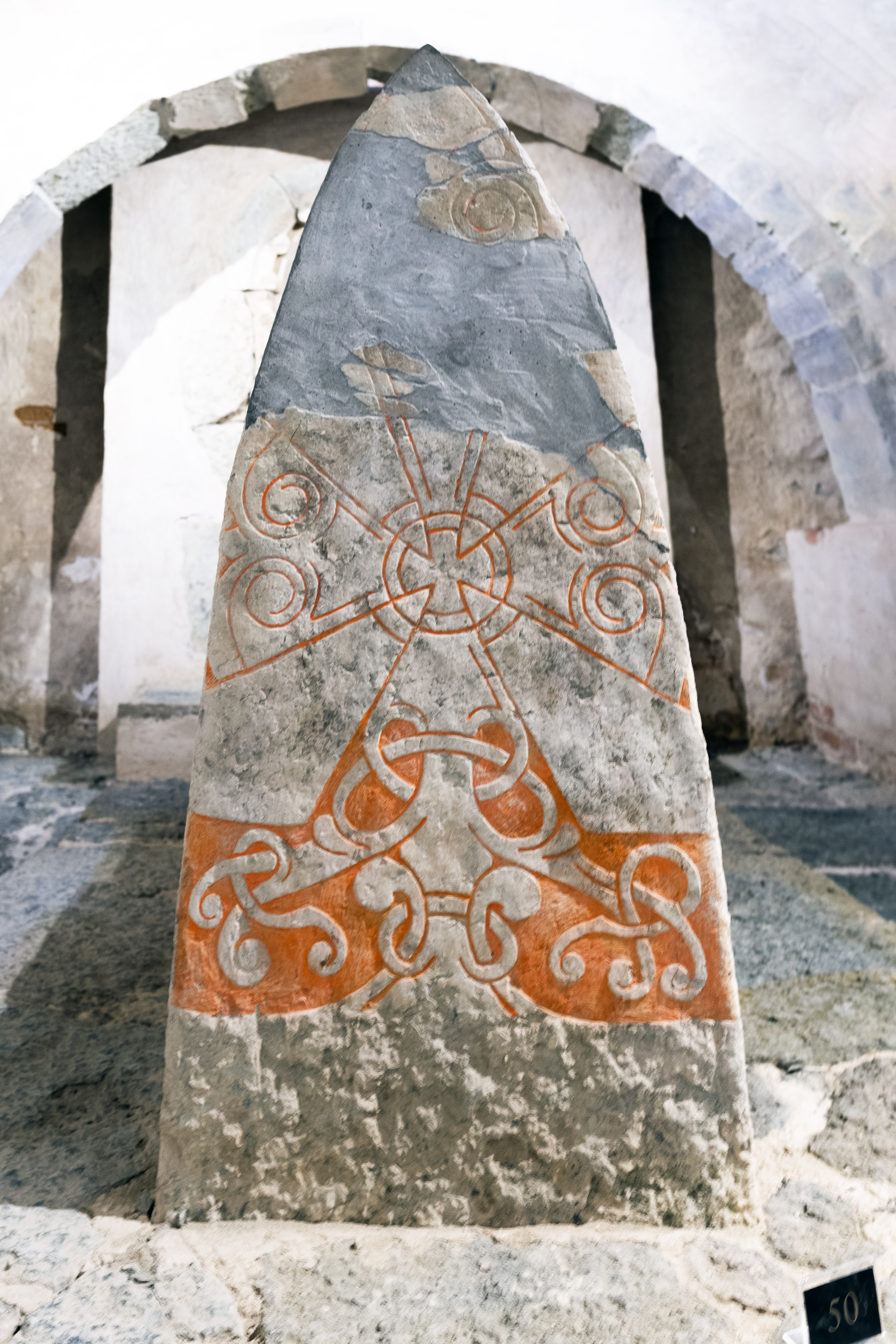
Reconstructed coffin, in the ma, in the storehouse of Vreta kloster.

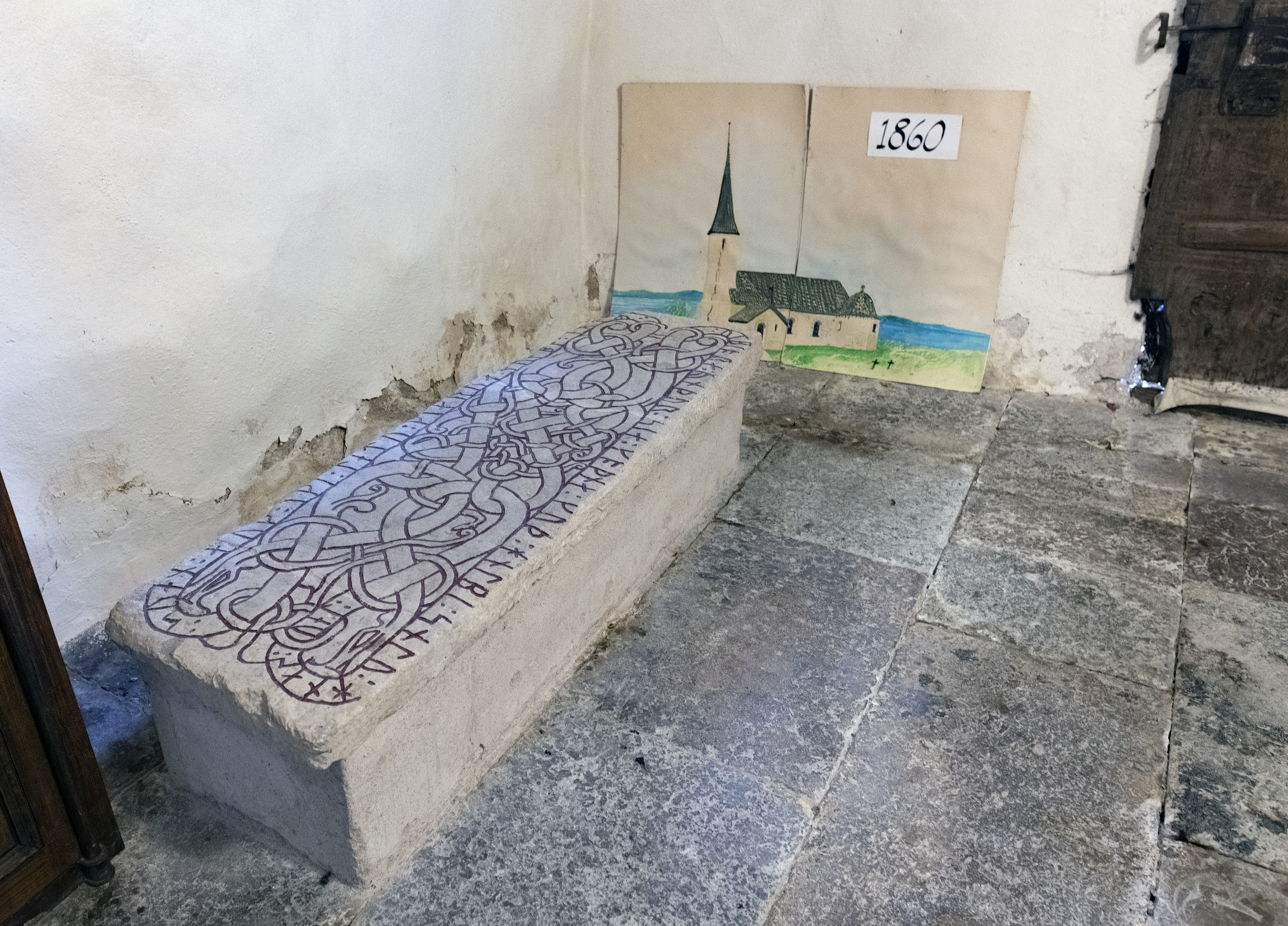
Stone lid of Eskilsunakista 02, church of Östra Skrukeby

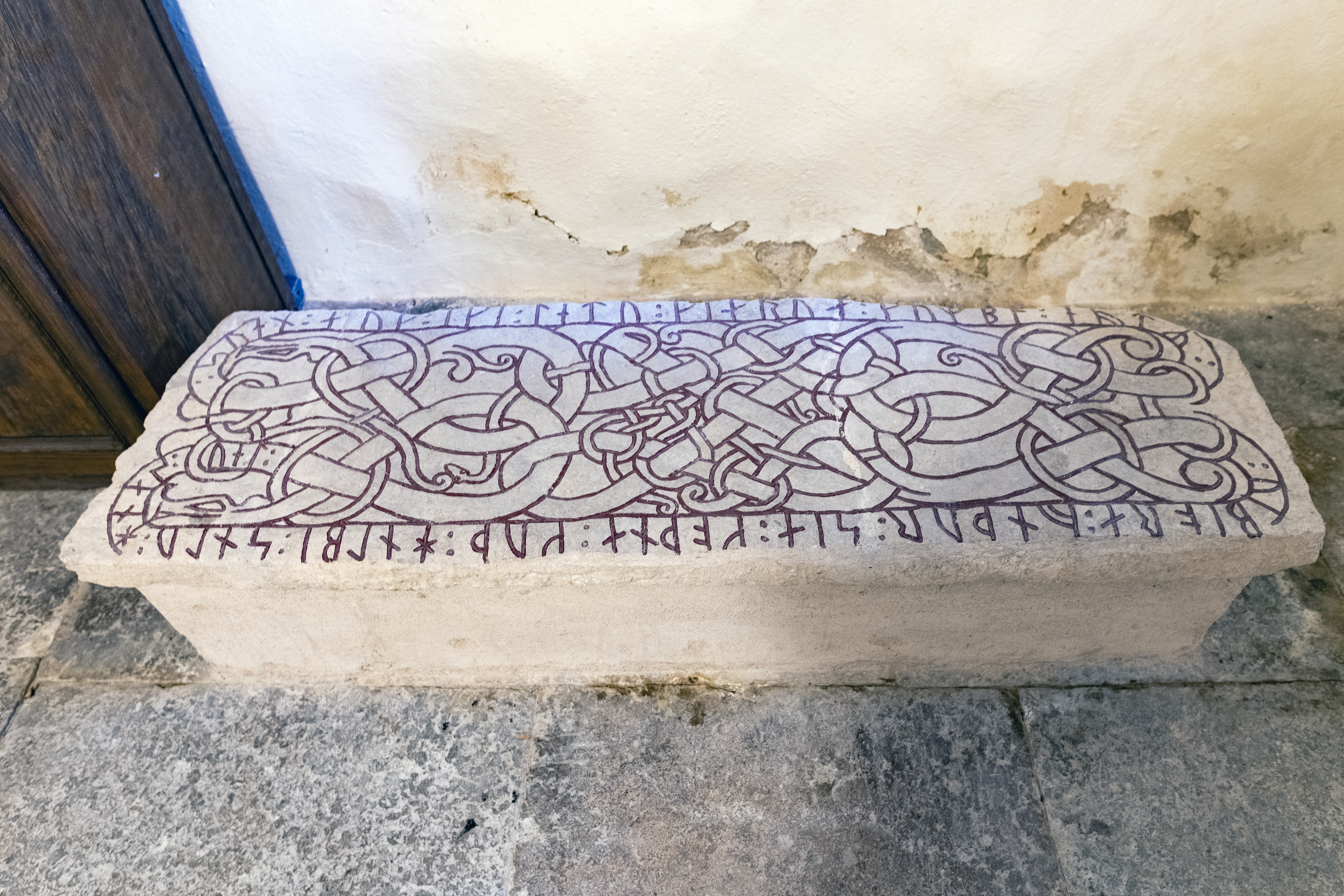
Stone lid of Eskilsunakista 01, church Östra Skrukeby

Eskilstunakista ("Eskiltuna coffin") is a Swedish term for early Christian grave monuments found in Sweden, influenced by the Anglo-Saxon tradition where venerated persons were buried in a specially designed stone coffin. Eskilstuna coffins were on the other hand never intended for the remains of the deceased, but was constructed on top of the burial site. The coffins consist of five ornamental stone slabs; two side slabs, two gable slabs, and a lid slab. The name originates from the first complete coffin found in Eskilstuna; later other fragments and slabs of the same kind have been identifiers as Eskilstuna coffins.

An Eskilstunakista is particularly designed stone coffin with peaked gable slabs on two opposing sides. The gables as well as the lid slab may be decorated with runic bands, and the inscriptions are similar to those on runestones, for example: X had this memorial made after Y, his good relative. God help his soul. The older ones from Öster- och Västergötland are mostly ornamented in Ringerike style. During the later half of the 11'th century the coffin type was used iSödermanland, Närke och Öland where the coffines were often decorated in a later Viking-age style, the Urnes style.

== Nomenclature ==
The first coffin of this type was found in 1912 in Eskilstuna. It was though then that the coffins were specific to that locality, whereupon they were labeled "Eskilstunakista". However, later finds of similar coffins were made in many other places in Sweden. They are particularly common in Östergötland, by Hovs kyrka there were forty. A large number are also found in Västergötland. Since they exist in many different localities the term "early Christian Swedish grave monument" is used.

== General ==
Early Christian funereal monuments were often constructed near the first churches in Sweden, especially in Götaland. They appear as a Christian funerary custom during the 11th century and consist of limestone slabs with ornamentation and runic inscriptions whose appearance is similar to contemporary rune stones. The slabs are categorized by their function in the coffin as gavel, lid, and side slabs. However, many coffins lack side slabs and in such cases the lid slabs were placed directly on the ground.

The lid and gable slabs are particularly richly ornamented and engraved with runic inscriptions. These grave monuments are especially common in Dals härad in western Östergötland, and Sweden's largest collection of such fragments has been found in i Köpings kyrka, Öland.

The coffins themselves do not contain skeletons but were intended as monuments over the deceased. However, the excavation of two Eskilstuna coffins at Husaby in Västergötland showed that funerals had taken place at a particular plot three times, but the lowest and possibly the middle layers were older than the Eskilstuna coffin.

== Successors ==
In some places, like in Västergötland and in Gotland, these coffins were supplanted in the end of the 11th century or beginning of the 12th century by lily stones, which in Gotland can even be found by the altar inside the churches and used in such ways that they should be considered as graves.

== Literature and sources ==
- Ljung, Cecilia: Under runristad häll. Tidigkristna gravmonument i 1000-talets Sverige Stockholm 2016. http://libris.kb.se/bib/19431997
- Sigurd Curman & Erik Lundberg: Sveriges kyrkor, Östergötland, Band II Vreta klosters kyrka, sid. 171–178, Esselte, Stockholm 1935
- Vikingatidens ABC, red. Carin Orrling, Statens Historiska Museum, 1995, ISBN 91-7192-984-3
