= Knut Stjerna =

Swedish archaeologist (1874-1909)

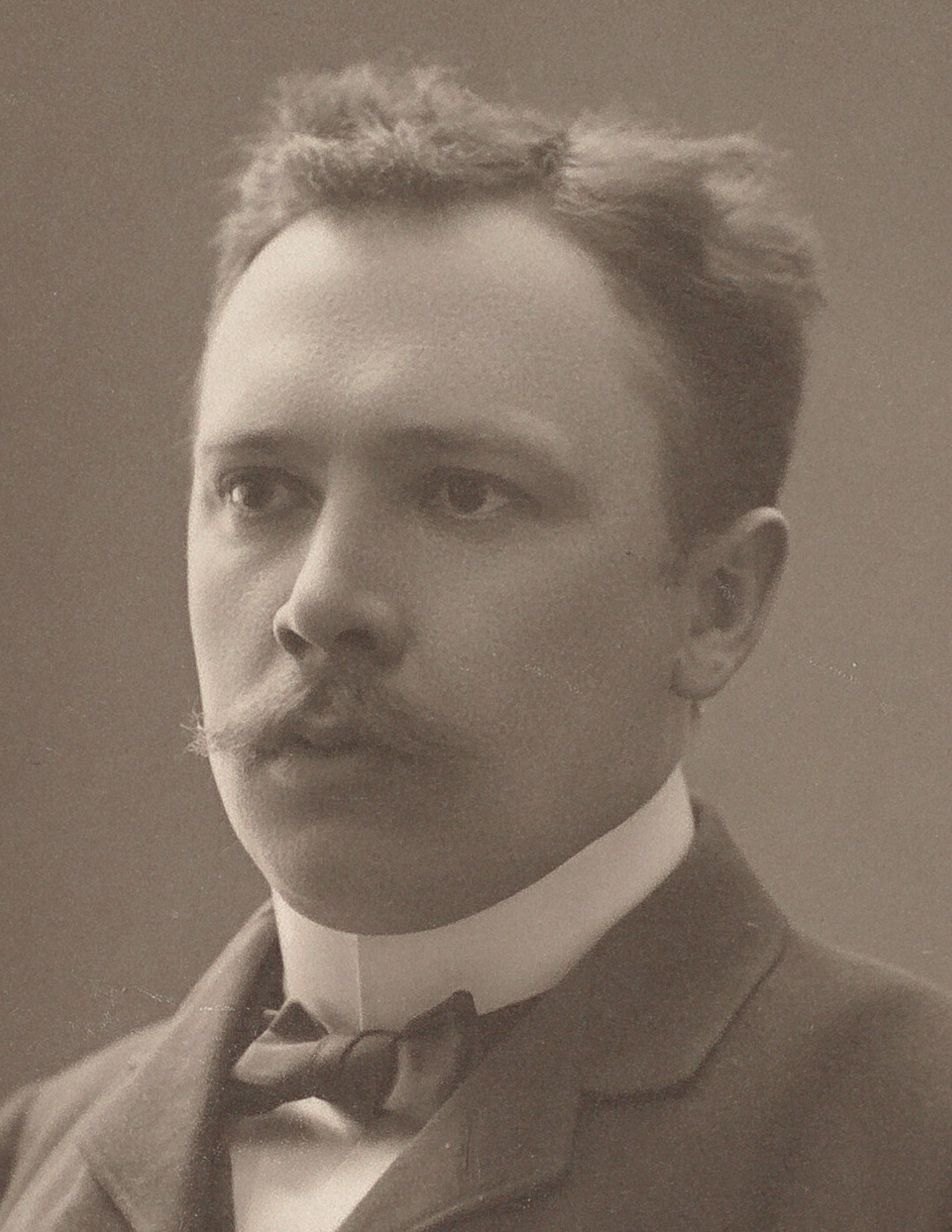
- Knut Stjerna
- Born: Knut Martin Stjerna; 14 March 1874; Malmö, Sweden
- Died: 15 November 1909 (aged 35); Uppsala, Sweden
- Occupation: Lecturer at Uppsala University
- Known for: Archaeology

Academic background
- Education: Lund University
- Thesis: Bidrag till Bornholms befolkningshistoria under järnåldern (1905)

Academic work
- Discipline: Archaeology
- Sub-discipline: Scandinavian archaeology
- Institutions: Uppsala University
- Notable students: Sune Lindqvist, Birger Nerman
- Notable works: Analyzing Beowulf

Knut Martin Stjerna (14 March 1874 – 15 November 1909) was a Swedish archaeologist and scholar. He is notable for a number of papers analyzing Beowulf from an archaeological perspective. He was a lecturer at Uppsala University, where he taught, among others, Birger Nerman and Sune Lindqvist.

== Early life and education ==
Knut Stjerna was born on 14 March 1874 in Malmö, Sweden. His parents were Carl Johan Stjerna, the traffic director of the Swedish State Railways, and Matilda Johanna Grönlund. Stjerna completed his secondary-school matriculation examination at the Higher General Secondary School in Malmö on 21 May 1892.

=== Lund University ===
On 6 September 1892, Stjerna enrolled at Lund University. He received his bachelors degree there two years later, on 30 May 1894. From June to August he embarked on a study tour to eastern Germany. He then began work on his licentiate degree, also at Lund University, initially focusing on art history and literary history. The teacher most influential for Stjerna was Henrik Schück; in his seminar on literary history, Stjerna presented his first major independent work, Erik den helige: en sagohistorisk studie ("Erik the Holy: a saga-historical study"), which was published in 1898.

Stjerna's paper on Saint Erik combined a comparative-literary methodology that was groundbreaking for its time along with uncompromising source criticism, and quickly attracted attention. It was not necessarily popular, however. Some historians called the approach hypercritical; reading the annual report for 1898, the secretary of the Swedish Historical Society said that Stjerna's paper had "caused a stir" (gjort uppseende), and threatened "to dissolve many of our historical personalities into myths" (få många af våra historiska personligheter upplösta i myter). Stjerna refused to back down in the debate that ensued, a stubbornness that would soon become characteristic of his scholarly career. Despite the initial pushback, the archaeologist Ture Johnsson Arne wrote in 1917 that Stjerna's view had become widely accepted.

The death of his father forced Stjerna to find work to support his family while he continued with his studies. He found employment at the newspaper Sydsvenska Dagbladet Snällposten, where he was personally recruited by its editor Carl Herslow, and began work on 15 December 1900. Stjerna was tasked with oversight over the newspaper's new Sunday supplement, and with maintaining contacts with representatives of science, art, and literature. Approaching the work enthusiastically, Stjerna helped produce broad, culturally oriented supplements which were considerably modern in style for the period.

=== Archaeology ===
In his studies, meanwhile, Stjerna increasingly turned to archaeology. Part of this was due to the intense opposition he had faced with his paper on Saint Erik; this caused him to question whether an academic career was realistically open to him. He may also not have received the support he hoped for from Schück, who left for Uppsala University in the fall of 1898.

In the autumn of 1901, Stjerna published his first independent contributions in Sydsvenska Dagbladet Snällposten, reporting on a visit to prehistoric rock carvings at Simrishamn. Before publication, Stjerna sent these to the well-known archaeologist Oscar Montelius for comment. Montelius appreciated the articles, marking the onset of a student–mentor relationship that soon shifted Stjerna's primary scholarly interests entirely towards archaeology.

Stjerna, who was in intense competition with a student and rival, Otto Rydbeck, quickly completed the requirements for a licentiate degree in comparative archaeology, which he received on 31 January 1902. He then worked feverishly to finish his doctoral dissertation. Simultaneously, he began writing a series of articles on the Old English epic poem Beowulf, combining literary history and archaeology.

On 17 March 1903, Stjerna took a second job; in addition to his academic duties and his work at the newspaper, he now worked as an assistant at the provincial archives in Lund; during various short stints he also served as the acting provincial archivist there, and for a week in December 1903 as the acting city archivist in Malmö. If a minor position, it helped give Stjerna access to the items for study. Around this time he also became deeply involved in civic and scholarly associations in southern Sweden, likely to help build connections within the academic world.

From 1903 to November 1904, Stjerna was embroiled in an academic dispute over the appointment of the next director of the Historical Museum. On one side of the dispute stood Rydbeck's school (supported by museum inspector Evert Wrangel and National Antiquarian Hans Hildebrand), which was rooted in art history and focused on medieval archaeology. Stjerna stood on the other side, alongside Montelius and the Uppsala archaeologists Bernhard Salin and Oscar Almgren; they emphasised typological prehistoric archaeology, explaining change through the evolution of artefact types. In November 1904, Rydbeck prevailed, and was appointed director of the museum.

Although disappointed in the outcome at the Historical Museum, Stjerna continued with his dissertation. He defended his dissertation on 23 September 1905. Entitled "A Contribution to the Population History of Bornholm during the Iron Age" (Bidrag till Bornholms befolkningshistoria under järnåldern), it was described by Almgren (Stjerna's opponent at the defense) as at once a solid and a brilliant work" (ett på samma gång solitt och genialt arbete). The work was an early and pioneering contribution to settlement archaeology in Sweden.

=== Politics ===
Also in 1905, Stjerna devoted significant energy towards political causes. That year, the union between Norway and Sweden was dissolved. Stjerna (who had already proposed a Swedish national anthem) published a nationalist pamphlet in the conservative newspaper Skånska Aftonbladet, arguing that Sweden should annex Narvik to create one of Western Europe's most important industrial and port cities. He also established close ties with Samuel Clason, who was deeply involved in the political debate over the union.

Through Clason, Stjerna became involved in a secret press campaign intended to sway European public opinion in Sweden's favor during the union negotiations. Using his newspaper contacts, he worked relentlessly to place Swedish articles in European newspapers—not an easy task, as sympathy abroad initially lay with Norway.

Even as his dissertation defense approached, Stjerna's attention remained focused on the union negotiations. A week beforehand, he sent repeated telegrams to Hjalmar Hammarskjöld, one of Sweden's four delegates, providing information on public opinion abroad and asking how he should proceed. The agreement dissolving the union was signed on the very day of Stjerna's defense.

The aftermath of Stjerna's efforts, however, was deeply disappointing to him. Honours were bestowed on the foreign journalists in Berlin and Paris that Stjerna had helped cultivate, rewarding their support; Stjerna received nothing. Stjerna was profoundly wounded by the way in which he was overlooked.

== Career ==
Following his dissertation defense and political activities, Stjerna returned fully to scholarship. Almgren, who in the late 1890s had established Sweden's first archaeology program at Uppsala University, was looking to relinquish responsibility for the subject, and worked to have Stjerna replace him. On 29 December 1905, Stjerna was thus appointed docent in Nordic and Comparative Archaeology at the university, setting him up to replace Almgren.

Two days after his appointment as docent, Stjerna resigned from his newspaper jobs; the same month, he also resigned from the provincial archives. Supported by a scholarship from the Letterstedt Association, he then embarked on an extended study tour of Europe. Stjerna had by then already spent half a dozen study trips abroad during his vacations. (Note: These included June–August 1894 in eastern Germany; August 1896 in northern Germany; August–October 1897 in France and Italy; July–September 1898 in Gotland; July–August 1903, with a grant from the Letterstedt Association, in Germany and Austria-Hungary; and July 1904 in Denmark.) The 1906 trip (which he continued in 1908) included stops in what one writer termed virtually every country in Europe, During examinations of museum collections in France and Belgium Stjerna became particularly interested in problems relating to the Western European Stone Age; the interest would later shape his archaeological seminars.

Returning to Uppsala in the autumn of 1906, Stjerna initially shared teaching duties with Almgren for archaeology courses; beginning in the spring semester of 1907, he assumed sole responsibility for such instruction. Stjerna also engaged enthusiastically with the academic life of the city, becoming secretary of the Uppland Antiquities Society in May 1907, and of the cultural-historical society Urd (founded by Almgren) around the same time.

=== Studentholmen excavation ===
In 1907, Stjerna undertook a major archaeological excavation in Uppsala with his students. Excavation in preparation to build a new market hall had uncovered the remains of medieval buildings—soon identified as the ruins of the oldest part of the university, known as the Studentholmen ("Students' Islet"). Construction was halted, and Stjerna brought on to lead the excavation.

The excavation was enormous, and enormously complicated; it involved intricate layers of stone, brick, and timber structures. Stjerna had little practical excavation experience at the time, but approached the task with characteristic energy and ingenuity. He held seminar excavations on the site, turning the excavation into a training ground for his students, and thereby surrounding himself with enthusiastic and capable assistants. He also introduced a reward system for discovering important artifacts and, in an innovative step, hired an artist to construct a scale model of the enigmatic timber structures as they were gradually uncovered.

Stjerna also spent substantial amounts of energy defending the excavation against municipal authorities who, with the strong support of the newspaper Upsala Nya Tidning, were focused on the city's financial interests. Although the conflict grew increasingly bitter, Stjerna, along with the city's academic community, succeeded in raising funds to move the market hall approximately ten meters, thereby preventing the demolition of the newly exposed medieval walls.

=== Stone Age studies ===
Through his archaeological seminar, Stjerna also aimed to provide the first comprehensive study of Sweden's entire Stone Age, continuing the interest he developed during his 1906 tour of Europe. The study was based on settlement archaeology; each student was given responsibility for investigating his home province, and maps were built showing the distribution of archaeological finds. The study was popular, causing more students to enroll in the seminar. During Stjerna's reports for twelve provinces were presented and discussed, and eight were published.

Stjerna aimed to write a comprehensive study of the Nordic Stone Age. As he did so, he began moving away from the strictly typological to archaeology that he had previously employed. He increasingly combined this with a more cultural-historical archaeology, focusing as well on human agency and free choice. This led to an increasing split with Montelius, who criticised Stjerna's methodology and termed it careless; Montelius urged Stjerna to not publish the study in its present form.

=== Final research ===
In April 1909, Stjerna became assistant curator at the Museum of Nordic Antiquities at Uppsala University. From the spring semester onward he held a docent's scholarship, also at Uppsala.

By autumn 1909, Stjerna's interests had shifted towards the Late Iron Age and the Christianization of Scandinavia, as well as the origin of Sweden's earliest towns. That October, he delivered a well-attended lecture in Uppsala that would form the basis of his last published work, "Lund and Birka". Published shortly after Stjerna's death, the article attracted considerable scholarly attention; its discussion of Birka soon became outdated as archaeological knowledge advanced, but its treatment of Lund had lasting importance for the archaeology of that city.

Also in autumn 1909, Stjerna conducted seminar excavations at a Viking Age cemetery at Årsta, on the edge of Uppsala. He returned there with his students in early November to carry out what then regarded as a spectacular archaeological feat: excavating and lifting as a single intact block of earth one of the cemetery's skeleton graves, for transport to the Museum of Nordic Antiquities.

== Legacy ==
Stjerna was remembered for his exceptional energy, as well as his imagination, synthesis, and ability to turn fragmentary material into coherent historical pictures. As both an academic teacher and an author, wrote Arne, Stjerna exerted a profound stimulating and invigorating influence. Reginald Allender Smith wrote that "Those who knew him best emphasize his sterling honesty and singleness of purpose, his unfailing courtesy and intellectual thoroughness", and that those "who only met him on his travels, will remember him as a conspicuous example of Scandinavian friendliness and scholarship".

One of Stjerna's most enduring contributions to archaeology was the elevated status that he gave to the discipline within the university. The subject became more visible and respected at the university, in no small part due to Stjerna's determination and relentless energy. This was likewise helped by the rigorous standards on which Stjerna insisted, putting the field on the same level as already-established academic fields. In 1913, a chair in Nordic and Comparative Archaeology was established at the university—the first professorship in archaeology in Sweden—largely due to Stjerna's earlier efforts.

Stjerna's students at the university included Sune Lindqvist and Birger Nerman. A member of Stjerna's seminar, Lindqvist thus gained experience with Stjerna's settlement analysis covering the country, and was exposed to excavation techniques that were particularly good for the time. Nerman, too, was involved in the settlement analysis; he was given responsibility for researching the Stone Age in Östergötland, which led to a publication in 1911.

== Personal life ==
By 1908 Stjerna's health was deteriorating; that December he was admitted to the hospital with heart arrhythmia, and was not discharged until March 1909. He resumed teaching and immediately picked back up his relentless pace of work, although he took a prolonged rest over the summer.

Stjerna's health remained precarious, likely due at least in part to his great energy; at the excavation at Årsta in November 1909, photographs recorded him looking emaciated, and he stopped lecturing early in the month. Only ten days after the excavation, on 15 November 1909, Stjerna collapsed and died, at the age of 35, while waiting for dinner at his usual restaurant. The cause was determined to be heart failure. Stjerna never married. He was buried in Malmö on 20 November, at a funeral was attended by many scholars, students, and friends.

After Stjerna's death, Almgren took back over the position of docent of Nordic and Comparative Archaeology. Almgren also served as Stjerna's literary executor.

== Publications ==
Stjerna published at least 23 works, several posthumous, between 1898 and 1911. They are listed on pages 265–266 of Hall's 1912 translation of Stjerna's works.

Between 1903 and 1908 Stjerna published a number of articles about the Anglo-Saxon epic poem Beowulf. The poem, wrote Smith, was Stjerna's "favorite study". In 1912 John Richard Clark Hall, who was also responsible for several early translations of the poem, translated these articles into English. Hall did so at the request of Almgren, and with the added support of Montelius. Stjerna's articles were credited with "providing a most welcome addition to the critical apparatus of the poem", by supplementing the meagre historical record with observations gleaned from archaeological research.

Two of Stjerna's publications—"The Swedes and the Getes during the Migration Period" (1905) and "The Northern Stone Age before the period of cist-burials" (1911)—were cited by Arne, in 1917, as continuing to provide research programmes for those continuing to investigate those periods.

- Stjerna, Knut (1898). "Erik den helige: en sagohistorisk studie" [Erik the holy: a saga-historical study]. Lunds Universitets årsskrift [Lund University yearbook] (in Swedish). 1. Lund: Lunds universitet: 1–34.
- Stjerna, Knut (1899). "Påfvebrefvet om Sankt Eriks korståg" [The papal brief on Saint Eric's crusade]. Historisk Tidskrift [Historical journal] (in Swedish). 19. Stockholm: Svenska Historiska Föreningen: 237–239.

- Follow-up published as Stjerna, Knut (1900). "Påfvebrefvet om Sankt Eriks korståg, II: Svar till herr C. M. Kjellberg" [The papal brief on Saint Eric's crusade, II: Reply to Mr C. M. Kjellberg]. Bilagor. Historisk Tidskrift [Historical journal] (in Swedish). 20. Stockholm: Svenska Historiska Föreningen: 1–6.

- Stjerna, Knut (1900). "Kompanihuset i Malmö" [The Merchant's Guild-house in Malmo]. Finn (in Swedish). Lund: Lukasgillet: 25–28. OCLC 476731230.
- Stjerna, Knut (1900). "Vår Folksång" [Our National Anthem]. Ord och Bild [Word and Image] (in Swedish). 9. Stockholm: Wahlström & Widstrand: 97–104.
- Stjerna, Knut (1903). "Hjälmar och svärd i Beovulf" [Helmets and Swords in Beowulf]. In Salin, Bernhard; Almgren, Oscar & Ambrosiani, Sune (eds.). Studier Tilägnade Oscar Montelius, 1903 af Lärjungar [Studies Dedicated to Oscar Montelius, 1903 by Students] (in Swedish). Stockholm: P. A. Norstedt & Söners. pp. 99–120.

- Translated in Stjerna 1912, ch. 1

- Stjerna, Knut (1903–1905). "Till de likarmade fibulornas typologi" [on the typology of symmetrical fibulae]. Månadsblad [Monthly journal] (in Swedish). 32–34 (373–408). Kungl. Vitterhets Historie och Antikvitets Akademiens: 423–436.
- Stjerna, Knut (1903–1905). "Arkeologiska anteckningar till Beovulf" [Archaeological Notes on Beowulf]. Månadsblad [Monthly journal] (in Swedish). 32–34 (373–408). Kungl. Vitterhets Historie och Antikvitets Akademiens: 436–451.

- Translated in Stjerna 1912, ch. 2

- Stjerna, Knut (1905). "Vendel och Vendelkråk" [Vendel and the Vendel Crow]. Arkiv för nordisk filologi [Archive for Nordic Philology] (in Swedish). 21. Lund: Axel Kock: 71–80.

- Translated in Stjerna 1912, ch. 3

- Stjerna, Knut (1905). "Bidrag till Bornholms befolkningshistoria under järnåldern" [A Contribution to the Population History of Bornholm During the Iron Age]. Antiqvarisk tidskrift för Sverige [Antiquarian journal for Sweden] (in Swedish). 18 (1). Stockholm: Kungl. Vitterhets Historie och Antikvitets Akademien: 1–296, I–VI.
- Stjerna, Knut (1905). "Sköld's hädänfard" [Scyld's Funeral Obsequies]. Studier tillägnade Henrick Schück på hans 50-årsdag den 2 November 1905 af Vänner och Lärjungar [Studies dedicated to Henrick Schück on his 50th birthday on November 2, 1905 by Friends and Disciples] (in Swedish). Stockholm: Hugo Gebers förlag. pp. 110–134.

- Translated in Stjerna 1912, ch. 5

- Stjerna, Knut (1905). "Svear och Götar under folkvandringstiden" [The Swedes and the Getes during the Migration Period]. Svenska fornminnesföreningens tidskrift [Journal of the Swedish Antiquities Association] (in Swedish). 12 (3): 339–360. Archived from the original on 28 March 2026.
- Stjerna, Knut (1906). "Review of Sveriges historia intill tjugonde seklet, by Oscar Montelius" [Review of Sweden's history until the twentieth century, by Oscar Montelius]. Historisk Tidskrift [Historical journal] (in Swedish). 26. Stockholm: Svenska Historiska Föreningen: 57–61.
- Stjerna, Knut (1906). "Drakskatten i Beovulf" [The Dragon's Hoard in Beowulf] (PDF). Fornvännen (in Swedish). 1: 119–144. ISSN 0015-7813.

- Translated in Stjerna 1912, ch. 6

- Stjerna, Knut (1906). "Tvenne fyndberättelser från 1752" [Two Descriptions of Finds from 1752] (PDF). Fornvännen (in Swedish). 1: 100. ISSN 0015-7813.
- Stjerna, Knut (1909). "Lund och Birka" [Lund and Birka]. Historisk tidskrift för Skåneland [Historical journal for Skåneland] (in Swedish). 3 (4–6): 171–225.
- Stjerna, Knut (1911). "Före hällkisttiden" [The Northern Stone Age before the period of cist-burials]. Antiqvarisk tidskrift för Sverige [Antiquarian journal for Sweden] (in Swedish). 19 (2). Stockholm: Kungl. Vitterhets Historie och Antikvitets Akademien: 1–164.
- Stjerna, Knut (1912). Essays on Questions Connected with the Old English Poem of Beowulf. Extra Series. Vol. III. Translated by Hall, John Richard Clark. London: Viking Club: Society for Northern Research.

== Bibliography ==
- Almgren, Oscar (1909). "Knut Stjerna". Historisk tidskrift för Skåneland. 3 (4–6): 216–330.
- "Årsberättelse för 1898" [Annual Report for 1898]. Historisk Tidskrift [Historical journal] (in Swedish). 19. Stockholm: Svenska Historiska Föreningen: 1–4. 1899.
- Arne, Ture Johnsson (1917). "Stjerna, Knut Martin". Nordisk familjebok. Vol. 22. Stockholm: Nordisk familjeboks förlags aktiebolagt. pp. 1407–1408.
- Arwidsson, Greta (1980–1981). "Sune Lindqvist". Swedish Biographical Dictionary (in Swedish).
- Brandberg, Theodor & von Bahr, Johan, eds. (1906). "Stjerna, Knut Martin". Uppsala Universitets Matrikel. Uppsala: Almqvist & Wiksell. pp. 148–149.
- Erdmann, Axel (1910). "Knut Stjerna". Upplands fornminnesförenings tidskrift [The journal of the Uppland Archaeological Society] (in Swedish). XXVI: 117–126.
- Nordström, Patrik (2007–2011a). "Stjerna, Knut Martin". In Karlsson, Åsa (ed.). Svenskt biografiskt lexikon. Vol. 33. Stockholm. pp. 497–502. OCLC 1139655.

- Published online as Nordström, Patrik (2007–2011). "Knut Martin Stjerna". Swedish Biographical Dictionary (in Swedish).

- Söderwall, Knut Fredrik (1906). "Knut Martin Stjerna". Medeltida rättsuttryck från Värmland, Närke och Småland. Lund: Håkan Ohlssons boktryckeri. p. xvii.
- Smith, Reginald Allender (1909–1910). "Obituary: Knut Martin Stjerna, Sweden" (PDF). Year Book of the Viking Club. II. London: Viking Club: 46–47.
- Stjernquist, Berta (1987–1989). "Birger Nerman". Swedish Biographical Dictionary (in Swedish).
