= Apuolė Hillfort =

Hillfort in Lithuanina

Coordinates: 56.246389°N 21.678056°E

- Apuolės piliakalnis (Lithuanian)
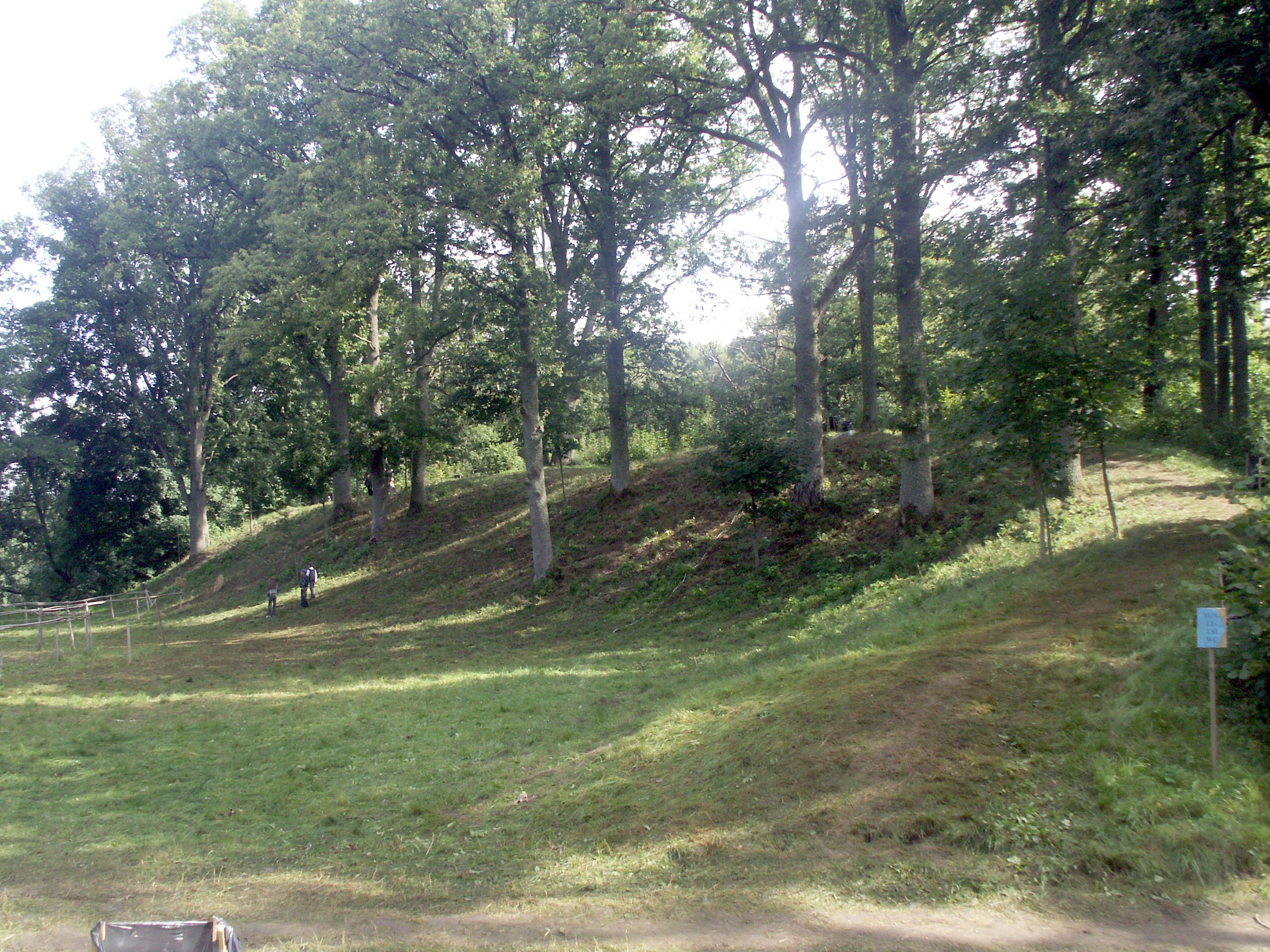
- Apuolė mound
- Interactive map of Apuolė Hillfort
- Type: Hillfort
- Periods: Early Middle Ages – High Middle Ages
- Location: Aleksandrija Eldership, Skuodas District Municipality
- Region: Klaipėda County, Lithuania

Site notes
- Height: 10 m (33 ft)
- Area: 6,400 m^{2} (69,000 ft^{2})
- Excavation dates: 1928-1930, 1931-1932, 1996

The Apuolė hillfort (Lithuanian: Apuolės piliakalnis) is a hillfort in Lithuania located by Apuolė, a historic village in Skuodas district municipality. The hillfort with a settlement is a cultural monument of the Republic of Lithuania of area 318,028 sq. m. The hill fort is situated at the confluence of the Luoba River and its tributary, Brukis Stream. Apuolė is the first Lithuanian place mentioned in historical sources, dated by 853.

== History ==
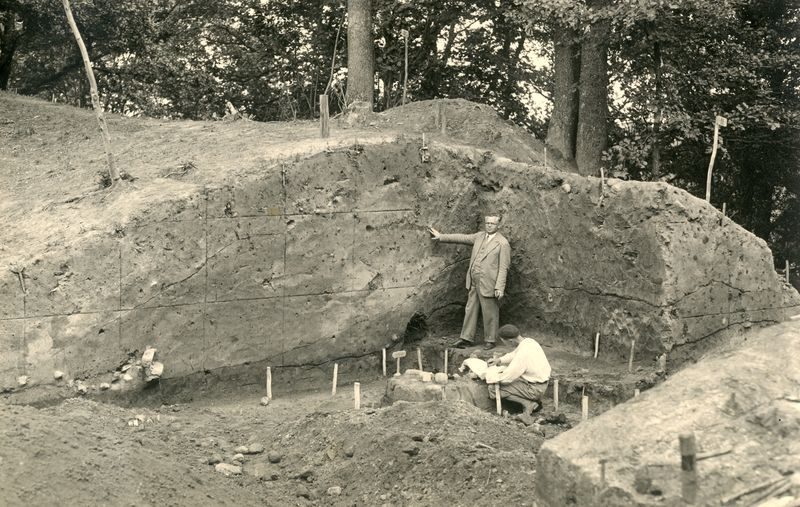
Archaeological excavation in 1931

Apuolė was an important hill fort of the Curonians, one of the Baltic tribes. Archaeologists dated the wooden fortress to the 1st century AD. According to archaeological research, a large village was situated near the hill fort. This would indicate early stages of city development.

Rimbert in his Vita Ansgari described early conflicts between the Curonians and vikings. In 854, Curonians rebelled and refused to pay tribute to Sweden. The rebellious fortress was first attacked by the Danes, who were hoping to make the town pay tribute to Denmark. The locals were victorious and gained much war loot. After learning of Danish failure, King Olof of Sweden organized a large expedition into Curonian lands. Olof first attacked, captured, and burned Grobiņa before besieging Apuolė. According to Rimbert, 15,000 locals defended themselves for eight days but then agreed to surrender: the Curonians paid silver ransom for each man in the fortress, pledged their loyalty to Sweden, and gave 30 hostages to guarantee future payments.

Apuolė was mentioned again only in a 1253 treaty between Bishop of Riga and Livonian Order. The location was described as uncultivated land. The castle was probably destroyed and the villagers moved to safer areas. The settlement was mentioned again in the 17th century. By late 18th century the hill fort attracted attention from historians and archaeologists. The first excavations were carried out by Eduards Volters and Birger Nerman in 1928–1932.

== See also ==
- List of hillforts in Lithuania
