= Mårten Stenberger =

Swedish archaeologist

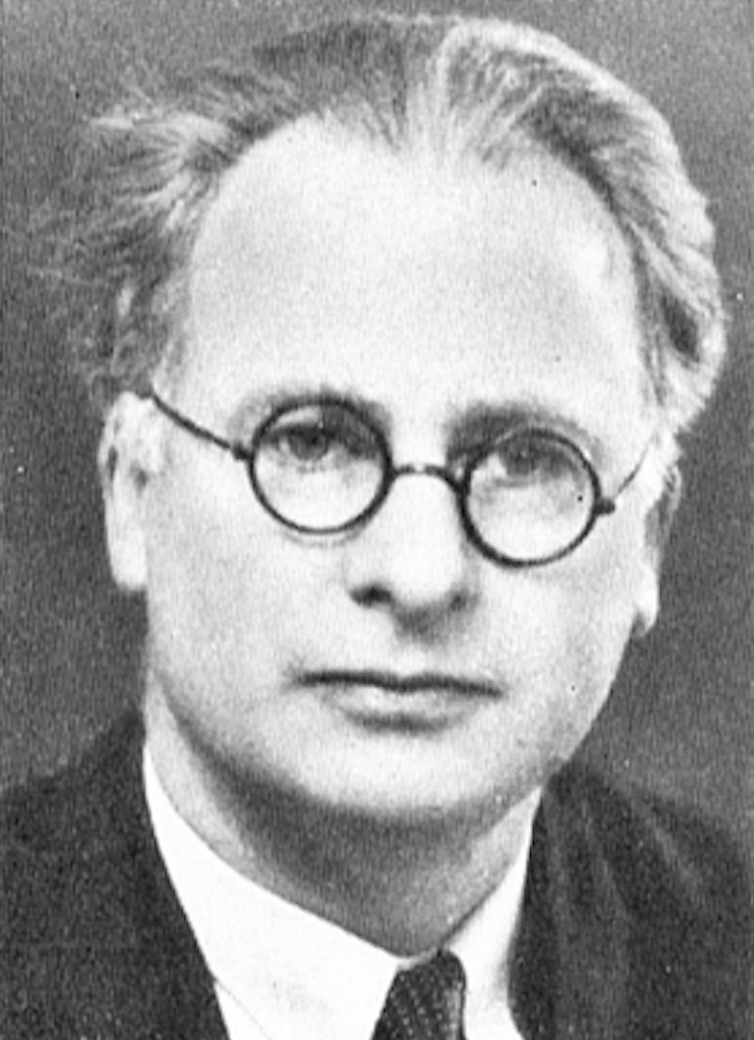
- between 1930 and 1950
- Born: 27 March 1898; Göteborg, Sweden
- Died: 19 January 1973 (aged 74); Stockholm County
- Scientific career
- Fields: Archaeology
- Institutions: Uppsala University
- Thesis: Oland under äldre järnåldern (1933)

Mårten Karl Herman Stenberger (27 March 1898 – 19 January 1973) was a Swedish archaeologist, who from 1952 to 1965 served as professor of archaeology at Uppsala University. Before his professorship he took part in many excavations, including in Öland, in Gotland, and in Greenland.

== Early life and education ==
Mårten Stenberger was born on 27 March 1898 in Gothenburg, Sweden, to Karl Nilsson Stenberger, a merchant, and Beda Kristina Stenberger (née Eriksson). He obtained a master's degree in geography, geology, mineralogy and Scandinavian and comparative archaeology, though was most interested in geology. In 1933 he obtained a Ph.D.; his dissertation, entitled Oland under äldre järnåldern ("Oland during the Early Iron Age"), is considered to be the first one in Sweden with a clear architectural-archaeological orientation.

== Career ==
Stenberger participated in numerous excavations throughout his career. Many summers were spent excavating Iron Age settlements in Öland, Sweden's second largest island, and in the 1930s he joined a Danish excavation to Greenland, where he dug out Viking Age houses. From 1934 onward, Stenberger spent his summers in Oland, and his winters lecturing in Uppsala. Further excavations from 1946 to 1950, of a town with stone houses, took place at Vallhagar (sv) in Gotland, and in 1955 he published a description of these in two extensive volumes.

From 1952 to 1965, following after Oscar Almgren and Sune Lindqvist, and coming before Bertil Almgren, Stenberger served as a professor of archaeology at Uppsala University.

== Personal life ==
Mårten Stenberger died on 19 January 1973, in Stockholm County.

== Bibliography ==
- Baudou, Evert (2007–2011). "Mårten KH Stenberger". Swedish Biographical Dictionary (in Swedish).
- Gräslund, Bo (2012). "Bertil Almgren" (PDF). Kungl. Vitterhets Historie och Antikvitets Akademiens årsbok (in Swedish): 19–25. ISBN 978-91-7402-413-5. ISSN 0083-6796.
