= Kaukolikai =

- Village
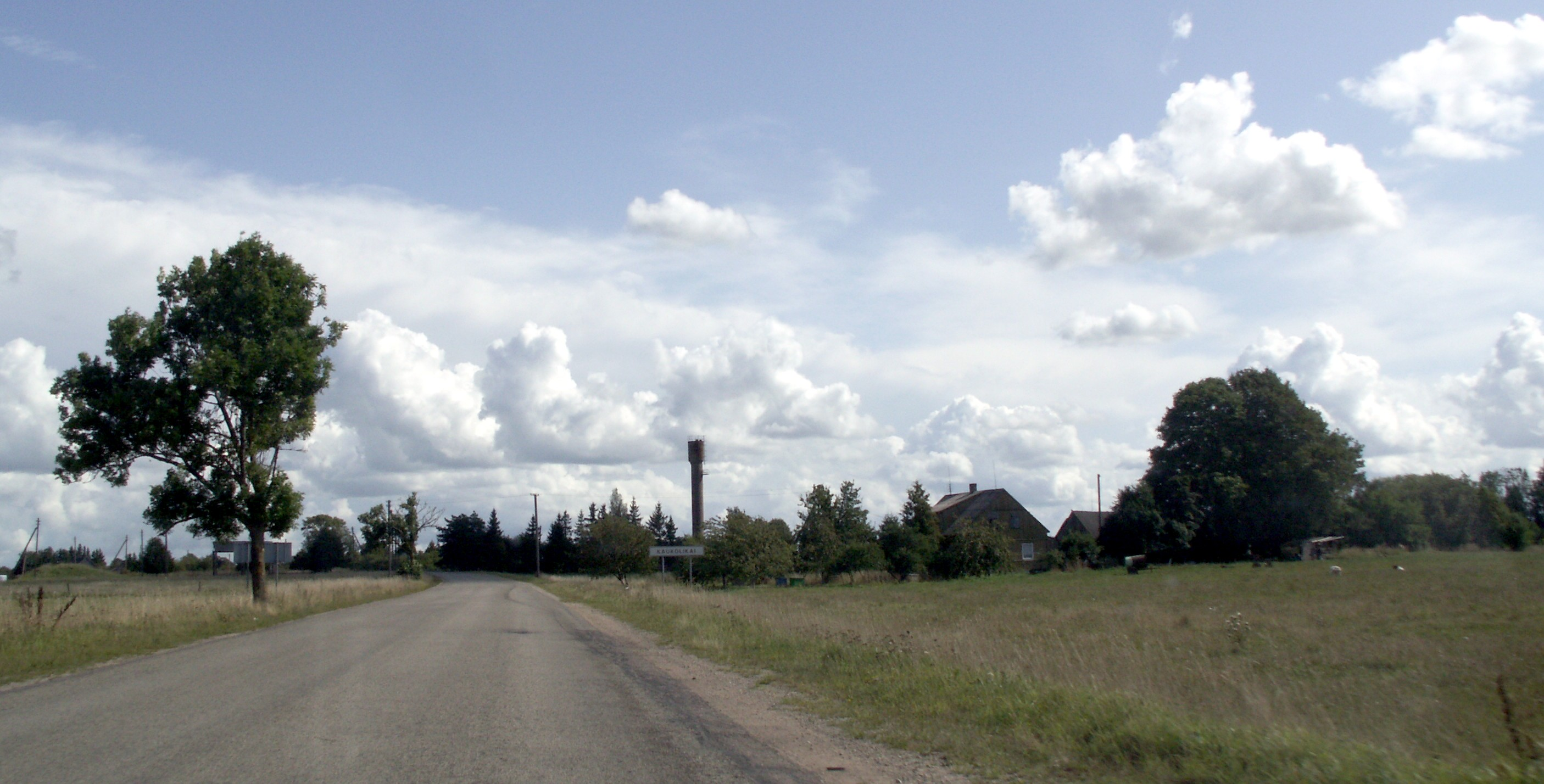

- Location of Kaukolikai
- Coordinates: 56.233°N 21.719°E
- Country: Lithuania
- Ethnographic region: Samogitia
- County: Klaipėda County
- Municipality: Skuodas District Municipality
- Eldership: Aleksandrijos Eldership

Population (2011)
  - Total: 285
- Time zone: UTC+2 (EET)
  - Summer (DST): UTC+3 (EEST)

Kaukolikai is a village in Lithuania. It is located in the Skuodas District Municipality. According to the 2011 census, the village had 285 residents.

== Notable residents ==
- Reda Cimmperman (b. 1979), Lithuanian botanist and ecotoxicologist, Ombudswoman for Academic Ethics
- Mia (b. 1983), Lithuanian singer

== Literatur ==
- Kaukolikai. Visuotinė lietuvių enciklopedija, T. IX (Juocevičius-Khiva). – Vilnius: Mokslo ir enciklopedijų leidybos institutas, 2006. 590 psl.
