= Skuodas Eldership =

Eldership of Lithuania

The Skuodas Eldership (Lithuanian: Skuodo seniūnija) is an eldership of Lithuania, located in the Skuodas District Municipality. In 2021 its population was 2320.
