= Almgren =

Almgren is a Swedish surname. Notable people with the surname include:

- Andreas Almgren (born 1995), Swedish middle- and long-distance runner
- Carl Eric Almgren (1913–2001), Swedish general and the army chief from 1969 to 1976
- Erik Almgren (1908–1989), Swedish footballer and football manager
- Esko Almgren (born 1932), Finnish politician
- Frederick J. Almgren Jr. (1933–1997), American mathematician
- Johanna Almgren (born 1984), Swedish female footballer
- Oscar Almgren (1869–1945), Swedish archaeologist specializing in prehistoric archaeology
