= Notėnai Eldership =

Eldership of Lithuania

The Notėnai Eldership (Lithuanian: Notėnų seniūnija) is an eldership of Lithuania, located in the Skuodas District Municipality. In 2021 its population was 763.
