= Mia (singer) =

Lithuanian singer, songwriter and television host (born 1983)

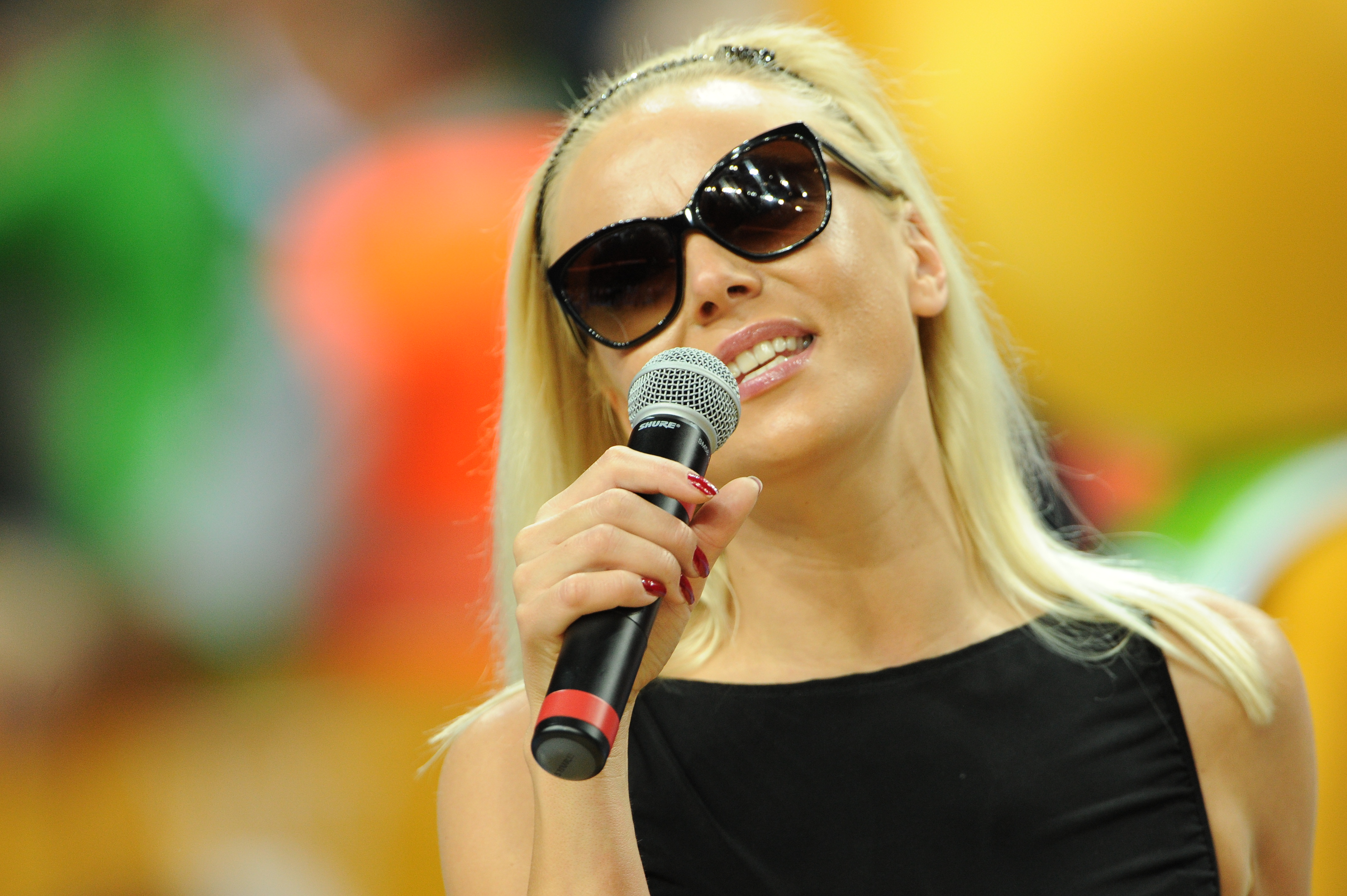
- Mia performing at EuroBasket 2011

Background information
- Born: Vilija Pilibaitytė; 19 July 1983 (age 43); Kaukolikai, Lithuania
- Genres: Pop; dance-pop; electropop; R&B; pop rock
- Occupations: Singer; songwriter; television presenter
- Instrument: Vocals
- Years active: 2004–present

Vilija Pilibaitytė (born 19 July 1983), better known by her stage name Mia, is a Lithuanian singer, songwriter and television host.

In 2004, she released her debut single "Kiekvienam", which was successful in Lithuania. Since 2009, she has hosted the show Muzikinė karuselė ("Musical carousel"). She has competed to represent Lithuania in the Eurovision Song Contest on four occasions; 2014, 2015, 2017 and 2018. She placed second in both 2014 and 2015.

== Career ==
=== 2004–2008: Early life and debut album ===
Mia was born on 19 July 1983 as Vilija Pilibaitytė in the village of Kaukolikai, located in Skuodas District Municipality. She grew up in Samogitia. Mia released her debut single "Kiekvienam" in 2004, which became a hit. In the same year she released her debut single "Aš krentu".

Later she signed a contract with Lithuanian record label, Melodija, and started recording her first album. In 2005, she released the song "Nešk mane", which was recorded with basketball player Tyrone Nesby. Mia went on to release another song with Tyrone called "Ar tu tai žinai?".

Mia covered the song "Sapnai" by SEL, which was complimented by band leader Egidijus Dragūnas. Later they wrote a song together, called "Muzika", for the new SEL album. In 2007 they won an award for Best Song at the Bravo Awards. Mia was also nominated for Best Female Singer at Vaikų Balsas.

In the same year, Mia released the new song "Yra, kaip yra", that later won the Best Song Award in Radiocentras and Vaikų Balsas in 2008. Mia also won the Best Female Singer award at Vaikų Balsas. She then released her debut album Yra, kaip yra and participated in projects like Žvaigždžių duetai and Kaimo grožybės. She also hosted a television reality show Trečias nereikalingas.

=== 2009–2013: Second album and other television projects ===
In 2009, Mia was nominated for the Best Female Singer Award at Vaikų Balsas and participated in the music project Žvaigždžių duetai. After that, Mia participated in another TV3 project called Žvaigždžių karai and also hosted Muzikos karuselė. In November, Mia released her second album Stiklo namai.

In 2010, she participated in another TV3 project Chorų karai, hosted Muzikos čempionų taurė, and won Best Female Singer at Vaikų Balsas. In 2011, Mia recorded a song with Marijonas Mikutavičius and Mantas Jankavičius, titled "Nebetyli sirgaliai". An English version of the song, "Celebrate Basketball", became the official basketball anthem for EuroBasket 2011. Later, TV3 created a television series based on her life, titled Kas nori nužudyti Mią?. Mia created a song for series, "Apkabink".

Mia participated in the dancing project Kviečiu šokti and singing projects Dainuok, jei gali and Žvaigždžių duetai.

=== 2014–present: Eurovizija ===
In 2014, Mia competed to represent Lithuania in the Eurovision Song Contest 2014, but placed second behind Vilija Matačiūnaitė. She returned the following year in Lithuania in the Eurovision Song Contest 2015, but placed second again, behind Monika Linkytė and Vaidas Baumila. She returned in 2017, and competed with the song "Sacrifice".

== Discography ==
- Yra kaip yra (2007)
- Stiklo namai (2009)

== Filmography ==
Year	Title	Role	Notes
2011	Kas nori nužudyti Mią?	Herself	Based on the real story of Mia's life.
