= Barstyčiai Eldership =

The Barstyčiai Eldership (Lithuanian: Barstyčių seniūnija) is an eldership of Lithuania, located in the Skuodas District Municipality. In 2021 its population was 675.
