= Apuolė =

- Village
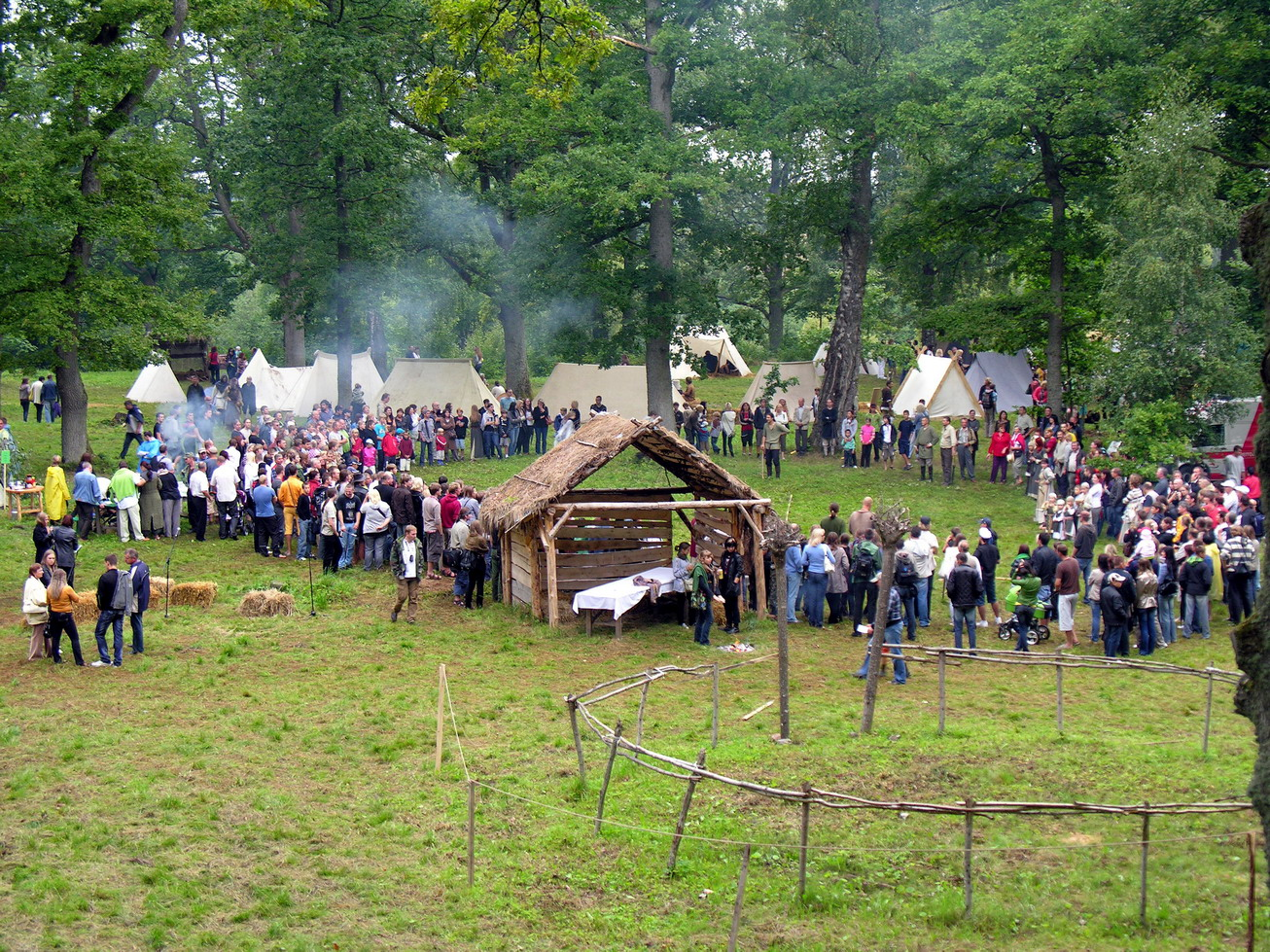
- Medieval festival in Apuolė

- Location in Lithuania
- Coordinates: 56°14′40″N 21°39′20″E
- Country: Lithuania
- County: Klaipėda County
- Municipality: Skuodas district municipality
- Eldership: Aleksandrija eldership
- First mentioned: 854

Population (2011)
  - Total: 119
- Time zone: UTC+2 (EET)
  - Summer (DST): UTC+3 (EEST)

Apuolė is a historic village in Skuodas district municipality, Lithuania. It is situated some 8 kilometres (5.0 mi) east of Skuodas by the Luoba River. It had a population of 132 according to the 2001 census and 119 according to the 2011 census.

The Apuolė hillfort is located by the village. Having survived a viking attack in 854, Apuolė is the oldest Lithuanian settlement mentioned in written sources. Since 2004, the attack is commemorated by an annual medieval reenactment Apuolė 854.

== History ==
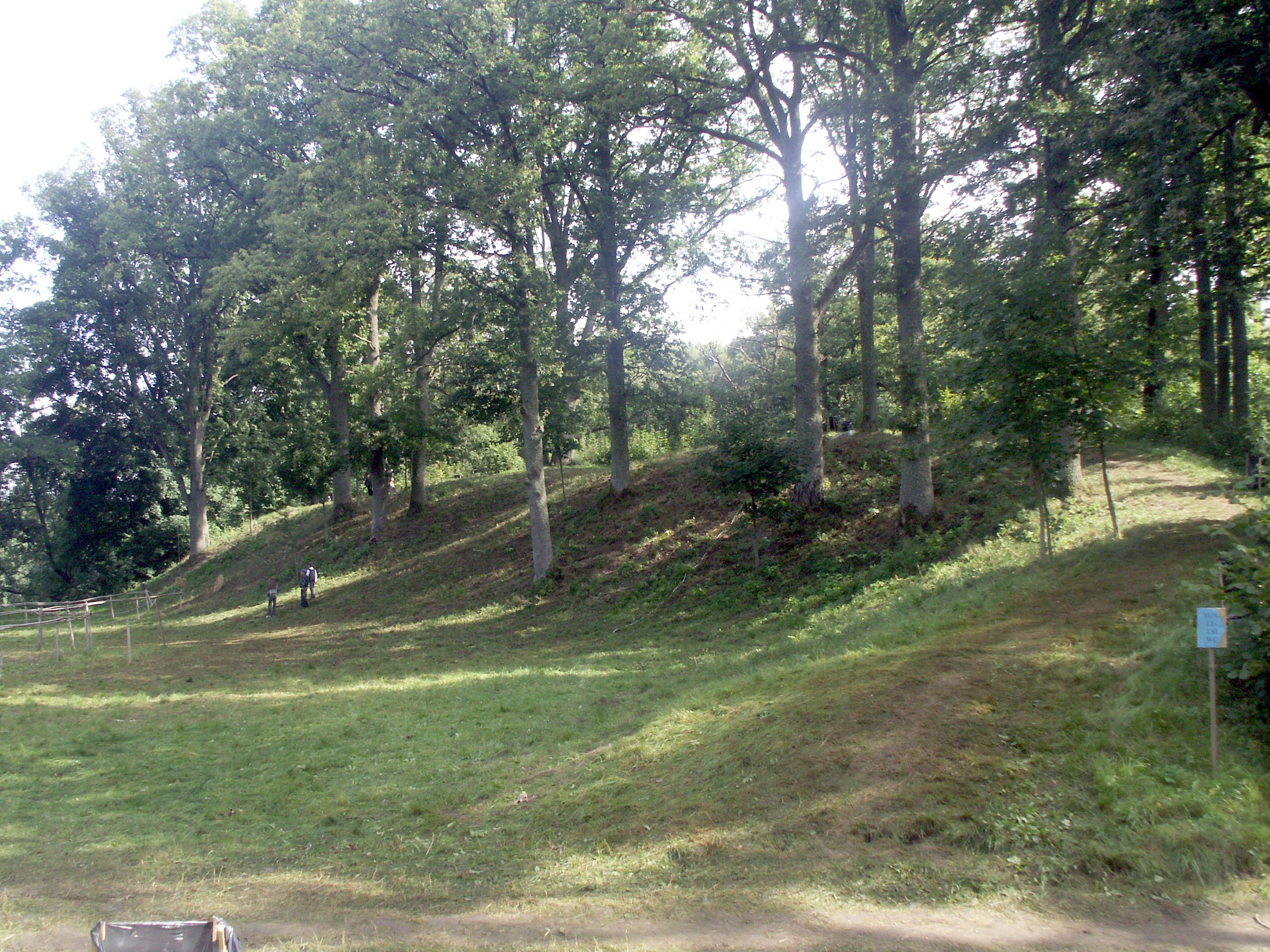
Apuolė mound

Apuolė was an important hill fort of the Curonians, one of the Baltic tribes. The hill fort is situated at the confluence of the Luoba River and its tributary, Brukis Stream. Archaeologists dated the wooden fortress to the 1st century AD. According to archaeological research, a large village was situated near the hill fort. This would indicate early stages of city development.

Apuolė was mentioned by Rimbert in his Vita Ansgari in the context early conflicts between the Curonians and vikings in 854. Apuolė was mentioned again only in a 1253 treaty between Bishop of Riga and Livonian Order. The location was described as uncultivated land. The castle was probably destroyed and the villagers moved to safer areas. The settlement was mentioned again in the 17th century. By late 18th century the hill fort attracted attention from historians and archaeologists. The first excavations were carried out by Eduards Volters and Birger Nerman in 1928–1932.
