= Mosėdis Eldership =

Eldership of Lithuania

The Mosėdis Eldership (Lithuanian: Mosėdžio seniūnija) is an eldership of Lithuania, located in the Skuodas District Municipality. In 2021 its population was 1900.
