= Aleksandrija Eldership =

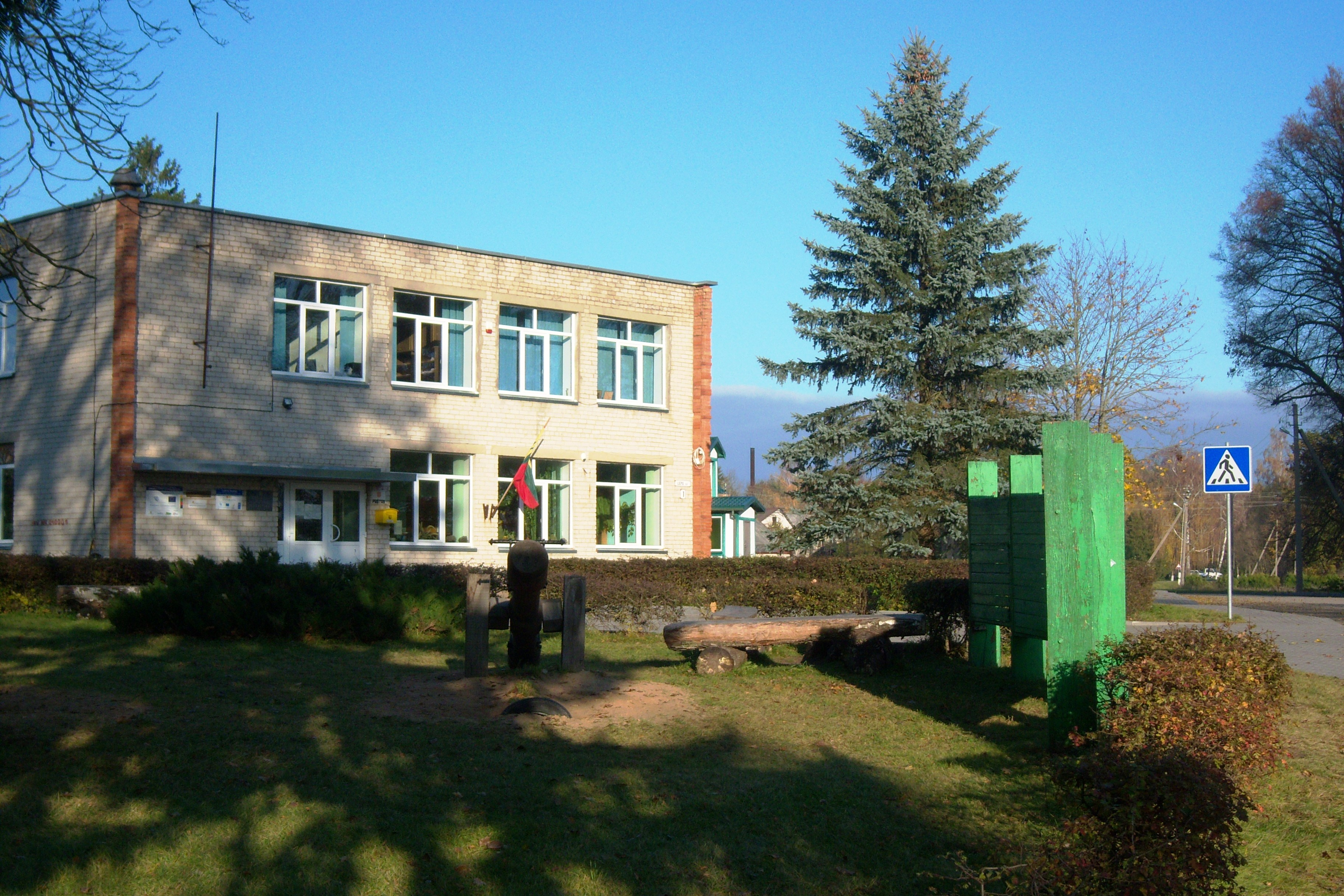
Aleksandrija Eldership

The Aleksandrija Eldership (Lithuanian: Aleksandrijos seniūnija) is an eldership of Lithuania, located in the Skuodas District Municipality. In 2021 its population was 1164.
