= Bertil Almgren =

Swedish archaeologist

- Born: September 27, 1918
- Died: March 4, 2011 (aged 92); Stockholm
- Known for: Professor at Uppsala University from 1965 to 1984
- Spouse: Inga
- Scientific career
- Fields: Archaeology
- Institutions: Uppsala University

Bertil Almgren (27 September 1918 – 4 March 2011) was a Swedish archaeologist and the son of Oscar Almgren, the country's first archaeology professor. Following Sune Lindqvist, he was a professor at Uppsala University from 1965 to 1984.

== Early life and education ==
Almgren was the son of Oscar Almgren, Sweden's first professor of Scandinavian and Comparative Archaeology. Bertil Almgren was born when his father was in his 50s and going blind, and so as a child would read him scholarly texts out loud. He would also accompany his father to the Royal Swedish Academy of Letters, History and Antiquities, taking notes of lectures and discussions. Educated in Uppsala, he graduated in 1936, and obtained his Ph.D. in 1955.

== Career ==
In 1956 Almgren he became a lecturer in Uppsala, a position he kept until 1962. That year he became a university lecturer, and in 1965 he succeeded Mårten Stenberger as a professor of Scandinavian and Comparative Archaeology.

Almgren focused his research on the Northern Iron Age, but included in his studies the periods from the Stone Age to historical times. He traveled extensively for his research, including across Europe, to the Mediterranean, the Middle East, and Asia. In the 1930s he excavated with Axel W. Persson in Dendra, Greece, and twenty years later he excavated in Persia with Carl Nylander (sv) and Hans Henning von der Osten (de).

One of Almgren's major works was Vikingen, later translated into English as "The Viking" as well as into Danish, Norwegian, German, French, Italian, Dutch, and perhaps other languages. The book was a collaboration between Almgren as researcher and an illustrator, and provided a popular account of the Vikings, and one of the most influential.

== Personal life ==
Almgren was married to Inga Almgren (born Henning), who died in the summer of 2010. He died in Stockholm on 4 March 2011.

== Publications ==
- Almgren, Bertil (1983). "Helmets, crowns and warriors' dress – from the Roman emperors to the chieftains of Uppland". In Lamm, Jan Peder & Nordstrom, Hans-Åke (eds.). Vendel Period Studies: transactions of the Boat-Grave Symposium in Stockholm, February 2–3, 1981. Studies – The Museum of National Antiquities, Stockholm. Vol. 2. Stockholm: Statens Historiska Museum. pp. 11–16. ISBN 978-91-7192-547-3.

== Bibliography ==
- Gräslund, Bo (2012). "Bertil Almgren" (PDF). Kungl. Vitterhets Historie och Antikvitets Akademiens årsbok: 19–25. ISBN 978-91-7402-413-5. ISSN 0083-6796. Archived from the original (PDF) on 2016-05-15.
