= Birger Nerman =

Swedish archaeologist (1888–1971)

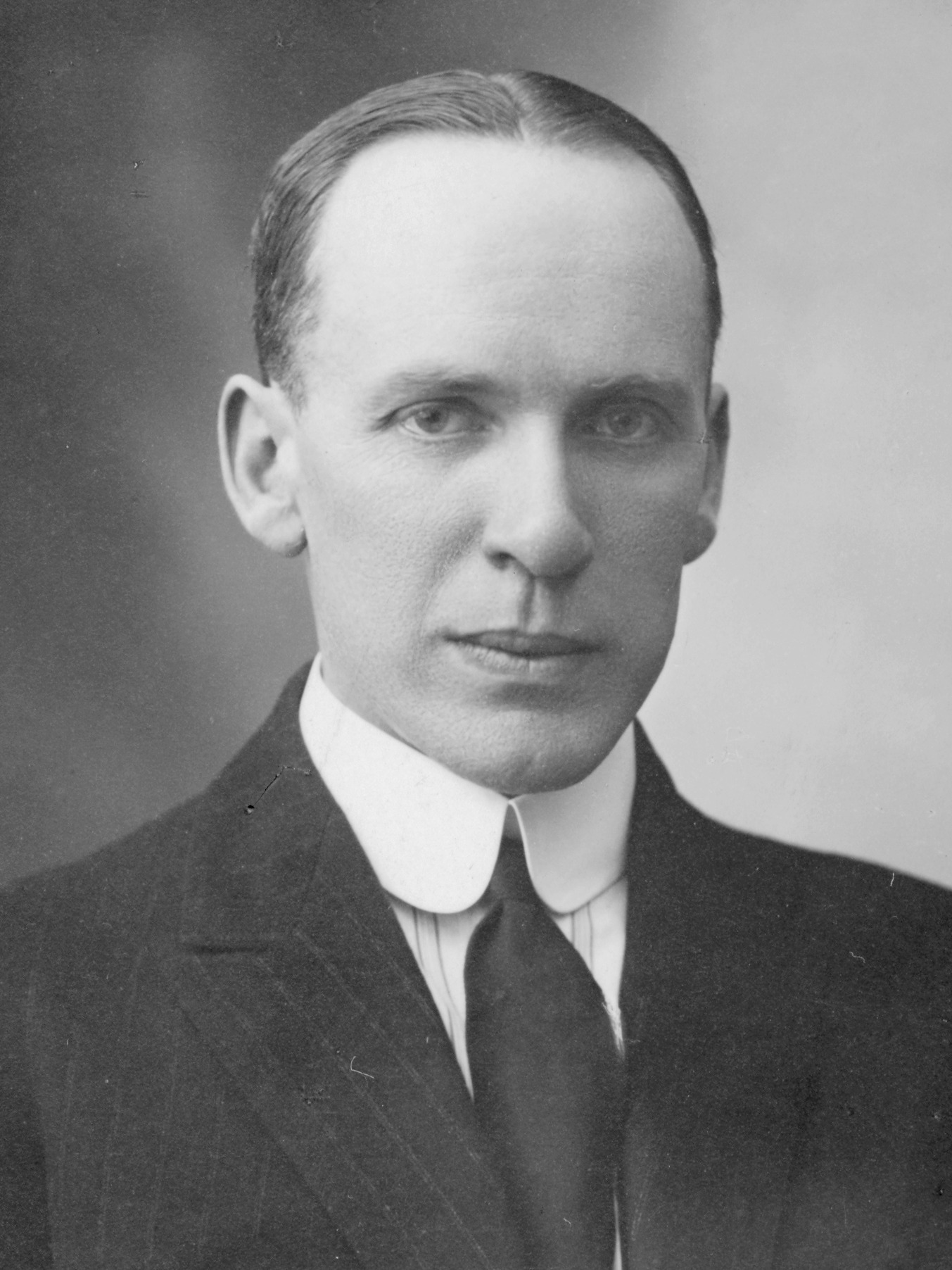
- Nerman in the 1920s
- Born: 6 October 1888; Norrköping, Sweden
- Died: 22 August 1971 (aged 82); Stockholm, Sweden
- Spouse: Zelma Nerman (m. 1932)
- Relatives: Einar Nerman (twin brother); Ture Nerman (older brother)

Academic background
- Education: Uppsala University (PhD)

Academic work
- Discipline: Archaeology; history; philology
- Institutions: Uppsala University; University of Tartu; Swedish History Museum
- Main interests: Sweden and the eastern Baltic in the Iron Age

Birger Nerman (6 October 1888 – 22 August 1971) was a Swedish archaeologist, historian and philologist who specialized in the history and culture of Iron Age Sweden.

Nerman was educated at Uppsala University, where he began his career as a lecturer in Nordic philology. He participated in archaeological excavations on Stone Age and Iron Age Sweden, and became noted for his efforts to combine archaeological and philological evidence. Areas investigated by Nerman include Gamla Uppsala and Gotland.

From 1923 to 1925, Nerman was professor of archaeology at the University of Tartu, during which he made contributions to the development of archaeology in Estonia. In subsequent years, he conducted excavations at Grobiņa and other places, with the aim of investigating relations between Sweden and the eastern Baltic in the Iron Age.

Nerman was director of the Swedish History Museum from 1938 to 1954, during which he organized several exhibitions on Swedish history. He was a Swedish nationalist who opposed both Nazism and Communism, and a noted advocate for the independence of the Baltic states. Nerman was the author of several scholarly works on Iron Age archaeology, and popular works on the culture and history of early Sweden.

== Early life and education ==
Birger Nerman was born in Norrköping, Sweden, on 6 October 1888. He was the son of Janne Nerman, a bookseller, and Ida Nordberg.

Nerman became a student in philology at Uppsala University in 1907, where he gained his doctorate in 1913 with a dissertation entitled Svärges hedna litteratur (Sweden's Pagan Literature), which was concerned with the Ynglingatal. Among his professors at Uppsala were Knut Stjerna, who left a strong influence on him. In studying Old English and Old Norse literature, Nerman argued that works such as Beowulf contained traces from Swedish oral literature of the Migration Period. His dissertation was criticized by several philologists for its use of archaeological evidence. This criticism encouraged Nerman to focus more on archaeology rather than philology, although he throughout his remaining career would continue to advocate cooperation between the two disciplines.

== Early career ==
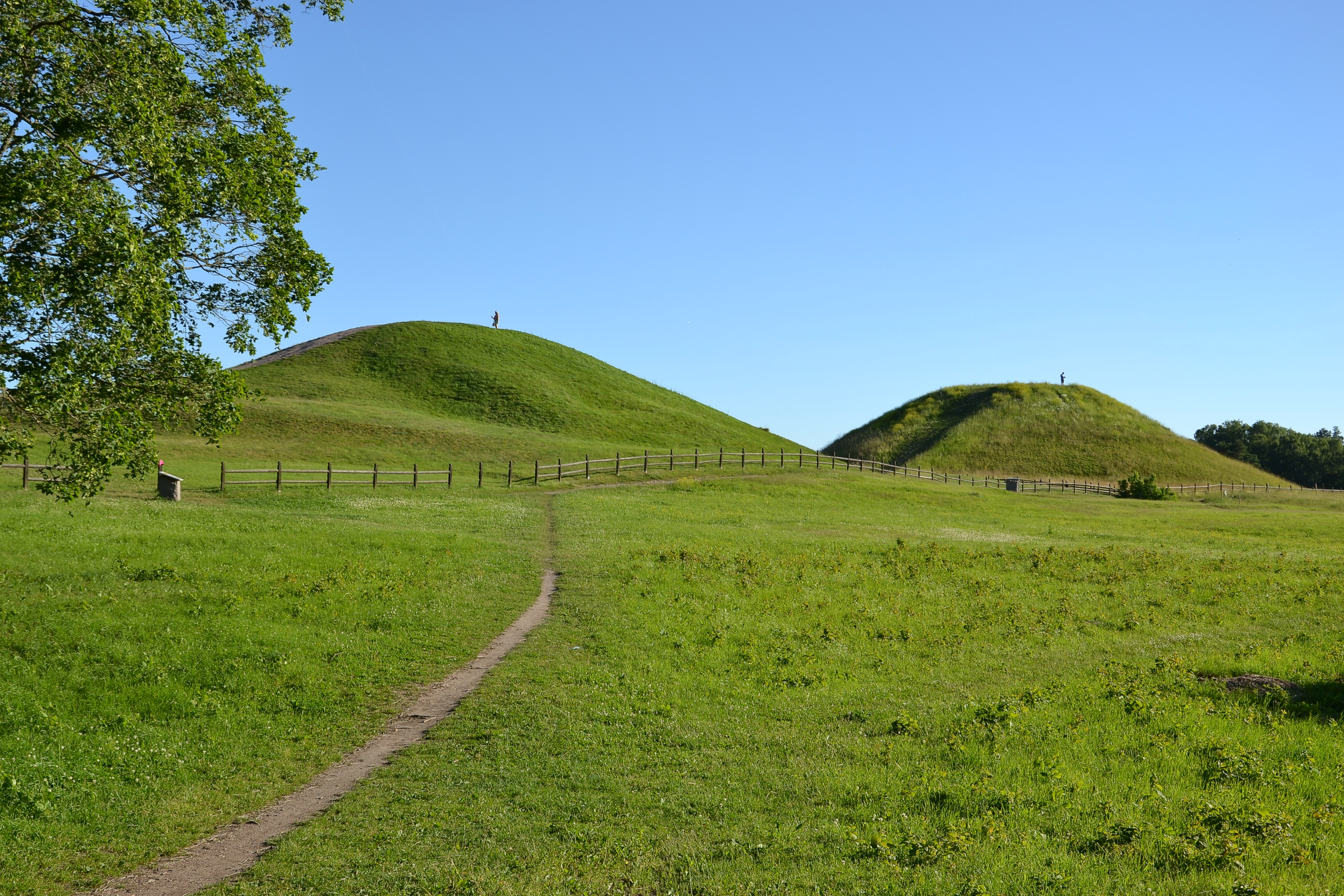
Royal mounds at Gamla Uppsala, where Nerman conducted much of his early research. In his studies of early Sweden, Nerman sought to combine archaeological evidence from Gamla Uppsala with evidence from Old English and Old Norse literature.

Together with Stjerna and later Oscar Almgren, Nerman became increasingly involved in archaeological research on the Swedish Stone Age and Iron Age. By combining philological and archaeological evidence, Nerman sought to gain further insight into the history and culture of Iron Age Sweden. His work in this regard was positively received by many Swedish archaeologists, including Oscar Montelius, and philologists. He participated in excavations at Gamla Uppsala, Vendel and Adelsö. His excavations at Gamla Uppsala were carried out with Sune Lindqvist.

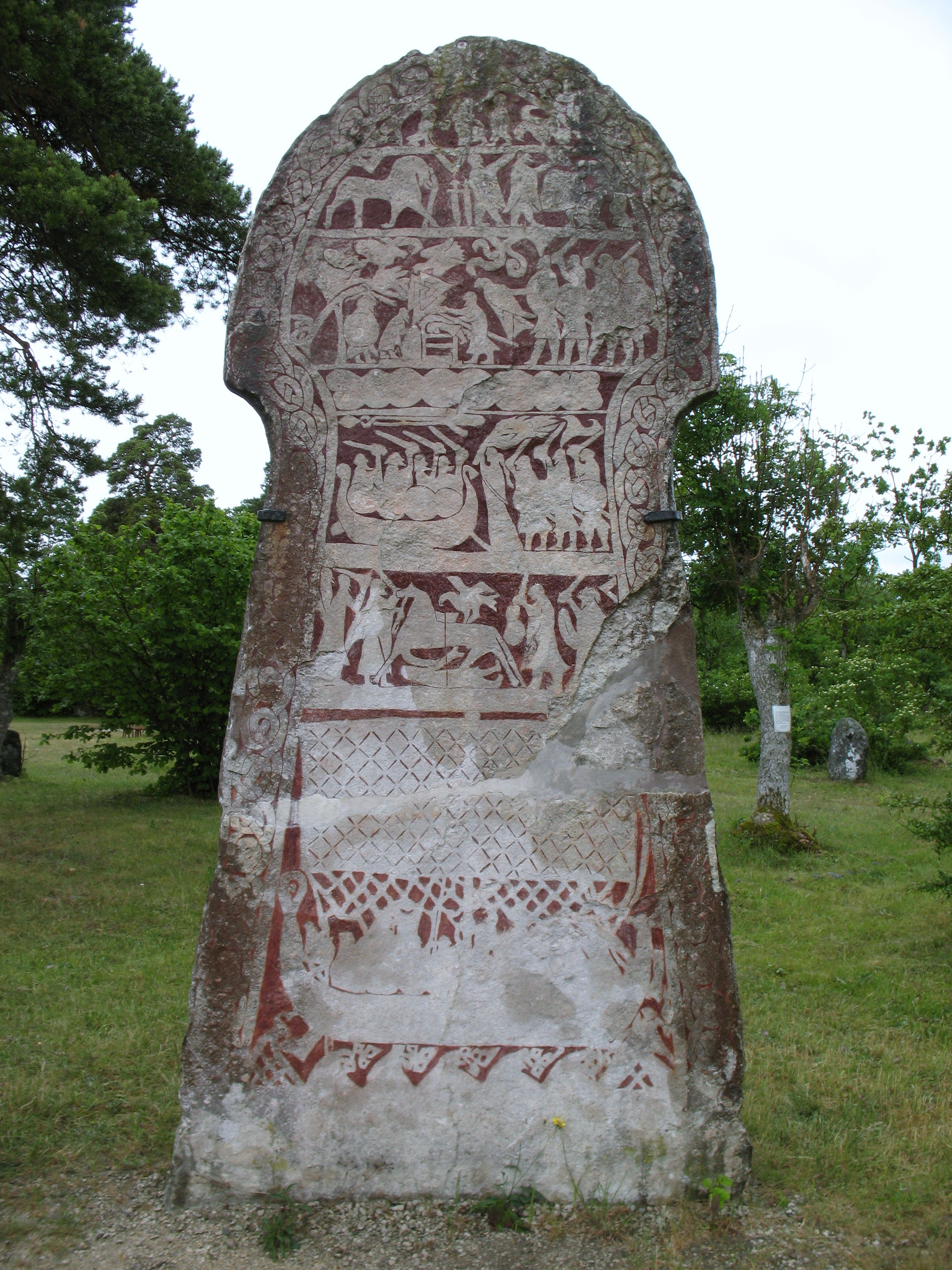
The Stora Hammars stone I of Gotland. Nerman is noted for his archaeological research on Iron Age Gotland.

From 1914, Nerman became increasingly involved with archaeological excavations in Gotland and the Baltic states. The connection between these two areas during the Iron Age became a subject of great interest to him. His publications on the archaeology of Iron Age Gotland, many of which were co-written with Almgren, became standard works on the subject.

At Uppsala University, Nerman was appointed an assistant professor in 1917, and a docent in 1919. During this time he lectured on Nordic philology, with particular focus on the sagas. He gained a filosofie licentiat in prehistory in 1918.

== Research in the eastern Baltic ==
From 1923 to 1925, Nerman was Professor of Archaeology at the University of Tartu, during which he laid the foundations for modern archaeology in Estonia. His years at Tartu would prove instrumental for his future scholarship. He conducted archaeological research at Izborsk, Estonia, in 1924.

Combined with his duties at the university, Nerman wrote a number of works on Swedish history intended for a popular audience. In En utvandring från Gotland och öns införlivande med Sveaväldet (1923) and Det svenska rikets uppkomst (1925), he argued that the Swedes had a powerful state and engaged in extensive colonizing ventures in the eastern Baltic as early as the Vendel Period. Nerman was a Swedish nationalist, and several of his works should be understood not only as scholarly contributions, but also as manifestations of Nerman's patriotism.

In 1929–1930, Nerman led excavations at Grobiņa, Latvia. The results of the excavations were published in Die Verbindungen zwischen Skandinavien und dem Ostbaltikum in der jüngeren Eisenzeit (1929). He believed that Grobiņa had been founded as a Swedish/Gotlandic colony, and that it was identical to the town of Seeburg mentioned by Rimbert in Vita Ansgarii. Scandinavian burials examined by Nerman at Grobiņa have been dated to as early as 650 AD, and thus predate the Viking Age. The finds at Grobiņa encouraged Nerman to conduct further research at Apuolė and Wiskiauten in 1931.

== Director of the Swedish History Museum ==
After his return from Tartu, Nerman worked for the Swedish History Museum, serving as its director from 1938 to 1954. He supervised the renovation of the museum building, and organized a number of successful exhibitions. Nerman spent much efforts at making the collections at the museum as accessible to the public as possible. He combined his duties at the museum with engagements as an author and public speaker.

Nerman was active in organizations working towards the preservation of Sweden's national heritage, serving as the secretary (1929–1939) and chairman (1939–1969) of the Swedish Antiquarian Society. From his days as a university professor in Estonia, he held a fondness for the Baltic states and its peoples. He played a leading role in establishing the Baltic Institute, and was the founding Chairman of the Baltic Committee. Nerman was an advocate for the independence of the Baltic states and rights of Balts and Estonians. During World War II, he was a member of anti-Nazi and anti-communist organizations.

Nerman retired from the Swedish History Museum in 1954. After his retirement, he continued to author works on Swedish archaeology.

== Personal life ==
Nerman married Zelma Nerman on 21 January 1932. He died in Stockholm on 22 August 1971. Nerman was survived by two daughters and several grandchildren.

== Selected works ==
- Studier över Svärges Hedna Litteratur. Uppsala: K. W. Appelbergs Boktryckeri. 1913.
- Vilka konungar ligga i Uppsala Högar?. Uppsala: K. W. Appelbergs Boktryckeri. 1913.
- Svärges älsta konungalängder som källa för svensk historia. Uppsala: K. W. Appelbergs Boktryckeri. 1914.
- Det forntida Stockholm. Stockholm: V. Petterson. 1922.
- (With Oscar Almgren) Die ältere Eisenzeit Gotlands. Vol. 1–2. Stockholm: Ivar Haeggström. 1923.
- En utvandring från Gotland och öns införlivande med Sveaväldet. Stockholm: Almqvist & Wiksell. 1923.
- Die Herkunft und die frühesten Auswanderungen der Germanen. Stockholm: Akademiens Förlag. 1924.
- Det svenska rikets uppkomst. Stockholm: Ivar Haeggström. 1925.
- Die verbindungen zwischen Skandinavien und dem Ostbaltikum in der jüngeren eisenzeit. Stockholm: Akademiens Förlag. 1929.
- The Poetic Edda in the Light of Archæology. London: Viking Society for Northern Research. 1931.
- Die Völkerwanderungszeit Gotlands. Stockholm: Verlag der Akademie. 1935.
- Sveriges rikes uppkomst. Stockholm: Skoglunds Bokförlag. 1941.
- Sveriges första storhetstid. Stockholm: Skoglunds Bokförlag. 1942.
- Gamla Upsala: Svearikets hjärtpunkt. Stockholm: Skoglunds Bokförlag. 1943.
- Tiotusen år i Sverige. Stockholm: Statens Historiska Museum. 1943.
- När Sverige kristnades. Stockholm: Skoglunds Bokförlag. 1945.
- Balticum skall leva!. Stockholm: Natur och Kultur. 1956.
- För Balticums frihet. Stockholm: Baltiska kommittén. 1969.
- Die Vendelzeit Gotlands: Text. Vol. 1. Stockholm: Almqvist & Wiksell. 1975. ISBN 9789174020168.
- Die Vendelzeit Gotlands: Tafeln. Vol. 2. Stockholm: Almqvist & Wiksell. 1969.

== See also ==
- Hector Munro Chadwick
- Jan de Vries (philologist)
- Herbert Jankuhn
- Anders Kaliff
- Gustaf Kossinna
- Magnus Olsen
- Eric Oxenstierna
- Gudmund Schütte
