= Eric Oxenstierna =

Swedish archaeologist

- Born: 20 September 1916; Stockholm, Sweden
- Died: 28 February 1968 (aged 51); Göttingen, Germany
- Spouse: Edith Drabsch-D'Amara
- Children: 2

Academic background
- Education: University of Berlin; Uppsala University
- Thesis: Die Urheimat der Goten (1948)

Academic work
- Discipline: Archaeology; History
- Main interests: Iron Age Sweden

Count Eric Carl Gabriel Oxenstierna (20 September 1916 - 22 February 1968) was a Swedish historian and archaeologist.

== Biography ==
Eric Carl Gabriel Oxenstierna was born in Stockholm on 20 September 1916. He was the son of prominent vicar Count B. G. Oxenstierna, and Borghild Kamph. Oxenstierna received his elementary education at Nya Elementar in Stockholm. He received his first PhD at the University of Berlin, and then a second PhD at Uppsala University. Oxenstierna subsequently published a number of influential works on archaeology, particularly regarding the Roman Iron Age of Sweden. His academic career was however cut short because of his enthusiasm for Nazi Germany, where he worked and taught during the Second World War. Oxenstierna died in Göttingen, Germany on 22 February 1968.

== Personal life ==
Oxenstierna was married to Edith Drabsch-D'Amara, with whom he had a son Gyrder and a daughter Gabriella. He lived for long periods in Lidingö, Stockholm.

== Selected works ==
- Die Urheimat der Goten. Johann Ambrosius Barth, Leipzig; Hugo Gerbers, Stockholm; 1948.
- Die Goldhörner von Gallehus. Eric Oxenstierna, Lidingo, 1956.
- The Norsemen, New York Graphic Society Publishers, 1956. (Translated and edited by Catherine Hutter)
- Scandinavia. Viking Press, New York, 1963. (Edited by Martin Huerlimann)
- The World of the Norsemen. Weidenfeld & Nicolson, London, 1967. (Translated by Janet Sondheimer)

== See also ==
- Birger Nerman
