= Bernhard Salin =

Swedish archaeologist (1861–1931)

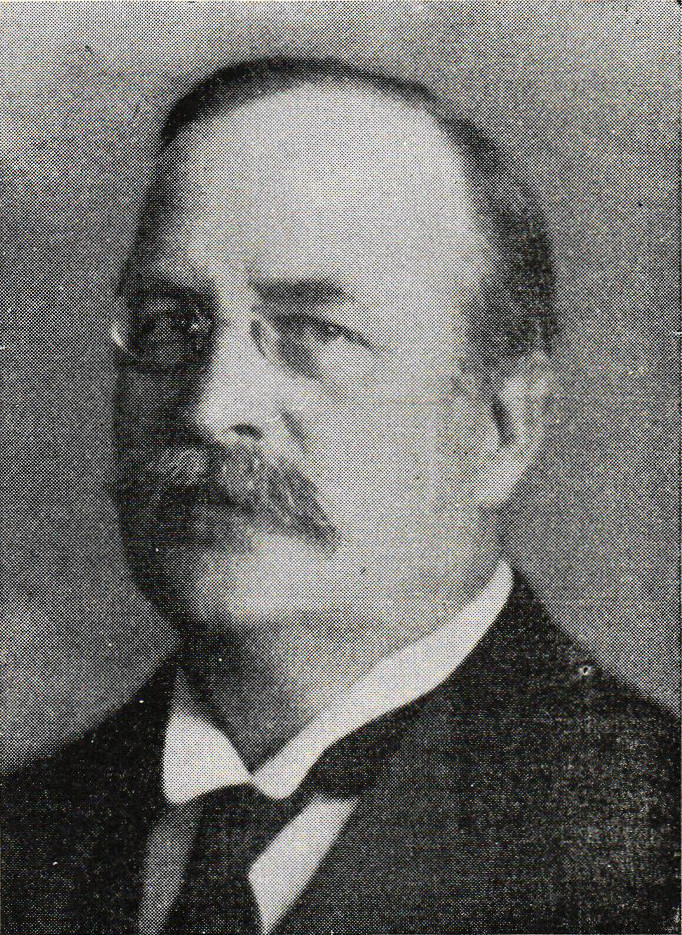
Carl Bernhard Salin c. 1931

Carl Bernhard Salin (14 January 1861, Örebro – 20 October 1931, Stockholm), was a Swedish archaeologist, cultural historian and museum curator.

Bernhard Salin took the matriculation examination at the Public Grammar School in Nyköping 28 May 1880 and then became a student at Uppsala University, where he became in 1885 Bachelor in Scandinavian languages, the aesthetics of art and literature, Latin, history, political science and astronomy. He became in 1888 Licentiate of Philosophy in Art History and PhD in aesthetics in 1890. Salin was admitted as assistant at the State Historical Museum in 1889, where he was promoted to second assistant curator in 1902. Salin became curator of the Nordic Museum in 1903 and was director of the Nordic Museum from 1905 to 1913 and from 1905 to 1912.

Salin was originally an art historian, but was interested in prehistoric archaeology, and as an archaeologist he participated including at the excavation in Siretorp in Blekinge in 1915. Salin devoted himself later to the history of religion, especially the development of Norse religion. He was an internationally recognized specialist in animal ornamentation. In 1891, 1892, 1894 and 1895, he carried out over a total of two years of extensive study in central and southern Europe. As a result of the trips he published in 1904 the work Altgermanische Thierornamentik containing style analysis and consideration of the various cultural currents during the Migration Period.
