= Swedish Historical Society =

Swedish society, founded in 1880

The Swedish Historical Society (Swedish: Svenska historiska föreningen) is a Swedish historical society, founded in 1880. Its members include academic researchers in History as well as students and other interested individuals. It arranges national history conferences every year, and has published the journal Historisk Tidskrift since 1881. Editorship of the journal circulates between History departments of the various Swedish universities.
