= Reginald Allender Smith =

British archaeologist

Reginald Allender Smith (1873 – 18 January 1940) was an archaeologist of Palaeolithic to late Anglo-Saxon materials. He was Keeper of British and Medieval Antiquities at the British Museum from 1927 to 1938, and authored several books and British Museum catalogues.

Smith attended University College, Oxford. He was first appointed to a job at the British Museum in 1898, and was succeeded by T D Kendrick upon his retirement from the role of Keeper. He was elected a Fellow of the Society of Antiquaries in 1903, serving as vice president from 1926 to 1929 and as director from 1929 to 1940.

He was on the side of the skeptics during the inquiry as to whether or not Piltdown Man was genuine, known for having offered a single line of testimony concerning a "bone implement" purported to be a tool. He remarked simply, it was reported, on "the possibility of the bone having been found and whittled in recent times."

== Selected publications ==
- Smith, Reginald Allender (1907–1909). "Notes on Bronze Hanging-Bowls and Enamelled Mounts". Proceedings of the Society of Antiquaries of London. 2nd series. XXII. Society of Antiquaries: 63–86.
- A Guide to the Antiquities of Roman Britain in the Department of British and Mediaeval Antiquities. London: Trustees of the British Museum, 1922.
- British Museum Guide to Anglo-Saxon Antiquities. British Museum. Department of British and Mediaeval Antiquities, 1923. Reprinted: Ipswich, Suffolk: Anglia Pub., 1993.
- Flints: An Illustrated Manual of the Stone Age for Beginners. London: British Museum, 1928.
