= Sune Lindqvist =

Swedish archaeologist

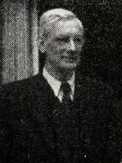
- Lindqvist in 1945
- Born: 20 March 1887; Eskilstuna, Sweden
- Died: 23 March 1976 (aged 89)
- Occupations: Archaeologist and scholar
- Known for: Finds from the boat graves at Valsgärde
- Relatives: Carl Axel Lindqvist and Eva Mathilda Hermannia Brambeck

Academic background
- Academic advisor: Knut Stjerna

Academic work
- Institutions: Swedish History Museum

Sune Lindqvist (20 March 1887 – 23 March 1976) was a Swedish archaeologist and scholar. He worked at the Swedish History Museum, where he was responsible for the finds from the boat graves at Valsgärde, and later at Uppsala University, where he wrote two major works alongside several hundred other publications.

== Early life and education ==
Sune Lindqvist was born on 20 March 1887 in Eskilstuna, Sweden, to Carl Axel Lindqvist and Eva Mathilda Hermannia Brambeck. He was fatherless from an early age, and was raised with three older siblings by his mother. He studied Nordic languages, geology and mineralogy under Knut Stjerna and Oscar Almgren.

== Career ==
Lindqvist worked at the Swedish History Museum for eighteen years, starting as an artist and researcher. He later became a departmental head, and was responsible for the study of material found in the boat graves at Valsgärde, including their restoration. In 1927 he became a professor of Scandinavian and Comparative Archaeology at Uppsala University, taking over a position vacated by Oscar Almgren two years previously. Almgren was the first person to have held the post, having taken it in 1913, but increasing blindness in his 50s required him to give it up. Lindqvist would in turn teach Almgren's son Bertil Almgren, one of Lindqvist's many students, and in 1965 Bertil Almgren would take over the position.

== Personal life ==
Lindqvist died three days past his birthday, on 23 March 1976.

== Publications ==
In addition to two major works, Uppsala högar och Ottarshögen and Gotlands Bildsteine, Lindqvist published more than 200 articles, notes, and reviews between 1909 and 1971.

- Lindqvist, Sune (1925). "Vendelhjälmarnas ursprung" (PDF). Fornvännen (in Swedish). 20: 181–207. ISSN 0015-7813.
- Lindqvist, Sune (1931a). En Hjälm från Valsgärde. Uppsala Universitets Årsskrift (in Swedish). Vol. 3. Uppsala: Almqvist & Wiksell.
- Lindqvist, Sune (1931b). "Båtgravarna vid Valsgärde" (PDF). Fornvännen (in Swedish). 26: 372–377. ISSN 0015-7813.
- Lindqvist, Sune (1932). "Vendel-time Finds from Valsgärde in the Neighbourhood of Old Uppsala". Acta Archaeologica. III: 21–46. ISSN 0065-101X.
- Lindqvist, Sune (1936). Uppsala högar och Ottarshögen (in Swedish). Stockholm: Wahlström & Widstrand.
- Lindqvist, Sune (September 1948). "Sutton Hoo and Beowulf". Antiquity. XXII (87). Translated by Bruce-Mitford, Rupert: 131–140. doi:10.1017/S0003598X00019669. S2CID 164075295.
- Lindqvist, Sune (1950). "Vendelhjälmarna i ny rekonstruktion" (PDF). Fornvännen (in Swedish). 45: 1–24. ISSN 0015-7813.

== Bibliography ==
- Arwidsson, Greta (1980–1981). "Sune Lindqvist". Swedish Biographical Dictionary (in Swedish).
- Gräslund, Bo (2012). "Bertil Almgren" (PDF). Kungl. Vitterhets Historie och Antikvitets Akademiens årsbok (in Swedish): 19–25. ISBN 978-91-7402-413-5. ISSN 0083-6796.
