= Oscar Almgren =

Swedish archaeologist

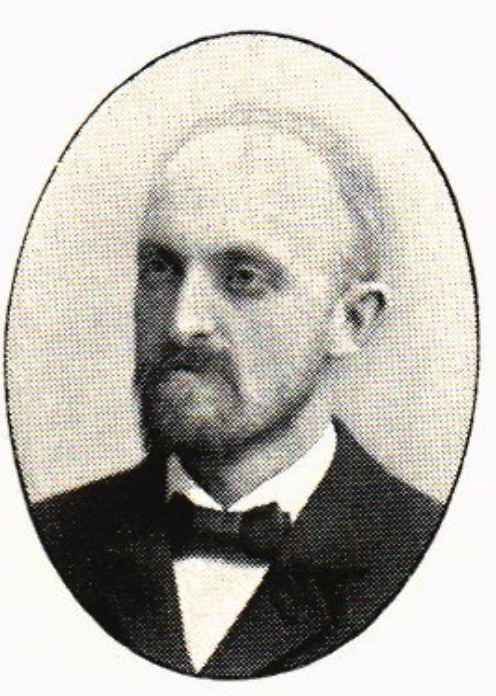
- Born: 9 November 1869; Stockholm, Sweden
- Died: 13 May 1945 (aged 75); Uppsala, Sweden
- Scientific career
- Fields: Archaeology
- Institutions: Uppsala University

Oscar Almgren (9 November 1869 – 13 May 1945) was a Swedish archaeologist specializing in prehistoric archaeology. He published a dissertation on Nordic types of brooches in 1897. He was also the father of Bertil Almgren, who followed in his father's footsteps in also becoming a professor of Scandinavian and Comparative Archaeology at Uppsala University.

== Career ==
Oscar Almgren studied under the Swedish archaeologists Hans Hildebrand and Oscar Montelius. The latter was a leading archaeologist in Europe at the time, and also a childhood friend of Almgren's father. In 1908 Almgren became a member of the Royal Swedish Academy of Letters, History and Antiquities, and in 1913 he became Sweden's first professor of Scandinavian and Comparative Archaeology, teaching at Uppsala University. Increasing blindness eventually made the position untenable, and in 1925 Almgren had to leave his post; two years later Sune Lindqvist, a former student, took the professorship.

Oscar Almgren's son, Bertil Almgren, was born in 1918, when Oscar Almgren was in his 50s. With his son's help and a photographic memory, Oscar Almgren was able to continue his research; Bertil Almgren, as a child, would read academic texts out loud to his father, and starting from the age of eight would accompany him to the Royal Swedish Academy of Letters, History and Antiquities, taking notes of lectures and discussions. The experiences were formative for Bertil Almgren, who in 1965 became, like his father, a professor of Scandinavian and Comparative Archaeology at Uppsala University.

== Personal life ==
Almgren was born on 9 November 1869, and died on 13 May 1945, at the age of 75.

== Publications ==
- Almgren, Oscar (1973) [1897]. Studien über nordeuropäische Fibelformen der ersten nachchristlichen Jahrhunderte, mit Berücksichtigung der provinzialrömischen und südrussischen Formen. Bonn: Habelt. ISBN 3-7749-1258-0.
- Almgren, Oscar (1909). "Knut Stjerna". Historisk tidskrift för Skåneland. 3 (4–6): 216–330.

== Bibliography ==
- Arwidsson, Greta (1980–1981). "Sune Lindqvist". Swedish Biographical Dictionary (in Swedish).
- Gräslund, Bo (2012). "Bertil Almgren" (PDF). Kungl. Vitterhets Historie och Antikvitets Akademiens årsbok: 19–25. ISBN 978-91-7402-413-5. ISSN 0083-6796. Archived from the original (PDF) on 15 May 2016.
- Nerman, Birger (1945). "In Memoriam: Oscar Almgren, 9. 11. 1869 – 13. 5. 1945" (PDF). Fornvännen (in Swedish). 40: 359–361. ISSN 0015-7813. Archived from the original (PDF) on 8 April 2018.
