= Skuodas District Municipality =

Skuodas District Municipality Skuodo rajono savivaldybė Skouda rajuona savėvaldībė
- Municipality
- Coat of arms

- Location of Skuodas district municipality within Lithuania

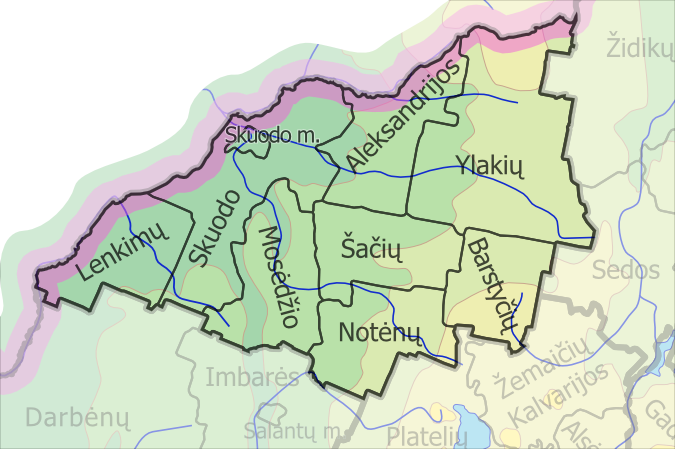
- Map of Skuodas district municipality
- Coordinates: 56°16′N 21°31′E
- Country: Lithuania
- Ethnographic region: Samogitia
- County: Klaipėda County
- Capital: Skuodas
- Elderships: 9

Area
  - Total: 911 km^{2} (352 sq mi)
  - Rank: 41st

Population (2021)
  - Total: 16,250
  - Rank: 47th
  - Density: 17.8/km^{2} (46.2/sq mi)
  - Rank: 34-35th
- Time zone: UTC+2 (EET)
  - Summer (DST): UTC+3 (EEST)
- Telephone code: 440
- Major settlements: Skuodas (pop. 5,508); Mosėdis (pop. 916); Ylakiai (pop. 713)
- Website: www.skuodas.lt

Skuodas District Municipality is one of 60 municipalities in Lithuania.

It is the only territory whose Council is using the Samogitian language.
