= 60S ribosomal protein L23a =

Protein found in humans

RPL23A

Identifiers
- Aliases: RPL23A, L23A, MDA20, ribosomal protein L23a
- External IDs: OMIM: 602326; MGI: 3040672; GeneCards: RPL23A
Available structures
PDB	Ortholog search: PDBe RCSB
PDB	List of PDB id codes 4UG0, 4V6X, 5AJ0, 3J7R, 4V5Z, 4UJD, 3J7P, 4D67, 3J92, 4D5Y, 3J7Q, 4UJE, 3J7O, 4UJC

Gene location (Human)
Chr.	Chromosome 17 (human)
Band	17q11.2	Start	28,719,985 bp
Band	17q11.2	End	28,724,359 bp

Gene location (Mouse)
Chr.	Chromosome 11 (mouse)
Band	11|11 B5	Start	78,071,758 bp
Band	11|11 B5	End	78,074,410 bp
RNA expression pattern
Bgee	Human / Mouse (ortholog); Top expressed in: left ovary; Achilles tendon; canal of the cervix; right ovary; right uterine tube; ectocervix; pituitary gland; skin of abdomen; body of uterus; skin of leg / Top expressed in: ovary; epiblast; ganglionic eminence; thymus; ventricular zone; uterus; embryo; adrenal gland; lip; blastocyst; More reference expression data
BioGPS	n/a
Gene ontology
Molecular function	rRNA binding; structural constituent of ribosome; protein binding; cadherin binding; RNA binding; TORC2 complex binding; large ribosomal subunit rRNA binding
Cellular component	cytoplasm; cytosol; ribosome; intracellular anatomical structure; nucleolus; cytosolic large ribosomal subunit; extracellular exosome; nucleus; TORC2 complex
Biological process	viral transcription; SRP-dependent cotranslational protein targeting to membrane; ribosomal large subunit assembly; translational initiation; nuclear-transcribed mRNA catabolic process, nonsense-mediated decay; cell population proliferation; protein biosynthesis; rRNA processing
Sources:Amigo / QuickGO
Orthologs
Databases	NCBI: entry; OMA: entry
Species	Human	Mouse
Entrez	6147	268449
Ensembl	ENSG00000198242	ENSMUSG00000058546
UniProt	P62750	P62751
RefSeq (mRNA)	NM_000984	NM_207523
RefSeq (protein)	NP_000975	NP_997406
Location (UCSC)	Chr 17: 28.72 – 28.72 Mb	Chr 11: 78.07 – 78.07 Mb
PubMed search
- Wikidata
View/Edit Human	View/Edit Mouse

Large ribosomal subunit protein uL23 is a protein that in humans is encoded by the RPL23A gene.

== Function ==
Cytoplasmic ribosomes, organelles that catalyze protein synthesis, consist of a small 40S subunit and a large 60S subunit. Together these subunits are composed of 4 rRNA species and approximately 80 structurally distinct proteins. This gene encodes a ribosomal protein that is a component of the 60S subunit. The protein belongs to the universal ribosomal protein uL23 family. It is located in the cytoplasm. The protein may be one of the target molecules involved in mediating growth inhibition by interferon. In yeast, the corresponding protein binds to a specific site on the 26S rRNA. This gene is co-transcribed with the U42A, U42B, U101A, and U101B small nucleolar RNA genes, which are located in its third, first, second, and fourth introns, respectively. As is typical for genes encoding ribosomal proteins, there are multiple processed pseudogenes of this gene dispersed through the genome.

== Clinical significance ==
L23a has been identified as an autoimmune target that causes a form of rheumatoid arthritis in mice and which also causes a reaction from T cells and autoantibodies from human rheumatoid arthritis patients.

== Pseudogenes ==
95 related pseudogenes are known, with symbols RPL23AP1 - RPL23AP97, excluding RPL23AP9 and RPL23AP13.
