= U42 =

U42 or U-42 may refer to:

- German submarine U-42, various vessels
- Great ditrigonal dodecicosidodecahedron
- HMS Modeste (U42), a sloop of the Royal Navy
- Small nucleolar RNA SNORD42
- South Valley Regional Airport, serving Salt Lake City, Utah, United States
- U42, a line of the Dortmund Stadtbahn
