= U101 =

U101 may refer to:

- German submarine U-101, various vessels
- Small nucleolar RNA SNORD101
- U-101-class submarine, of the Austro-Hungarian Navy
- Uppland Runic Inscription 101
