= Broby =

Broby can mean:

- Broby municipality in Denmark
  - Nørre Broby - a town in Broby municipality
- Broby, Sweden - a town in Östra Göinge, Sweden
- Broby bro Runestones, a group of runestones in Sweden
