= Hargs bro runic inscriptions =

Coordinates: 59°34′15″N 17°57′30″E

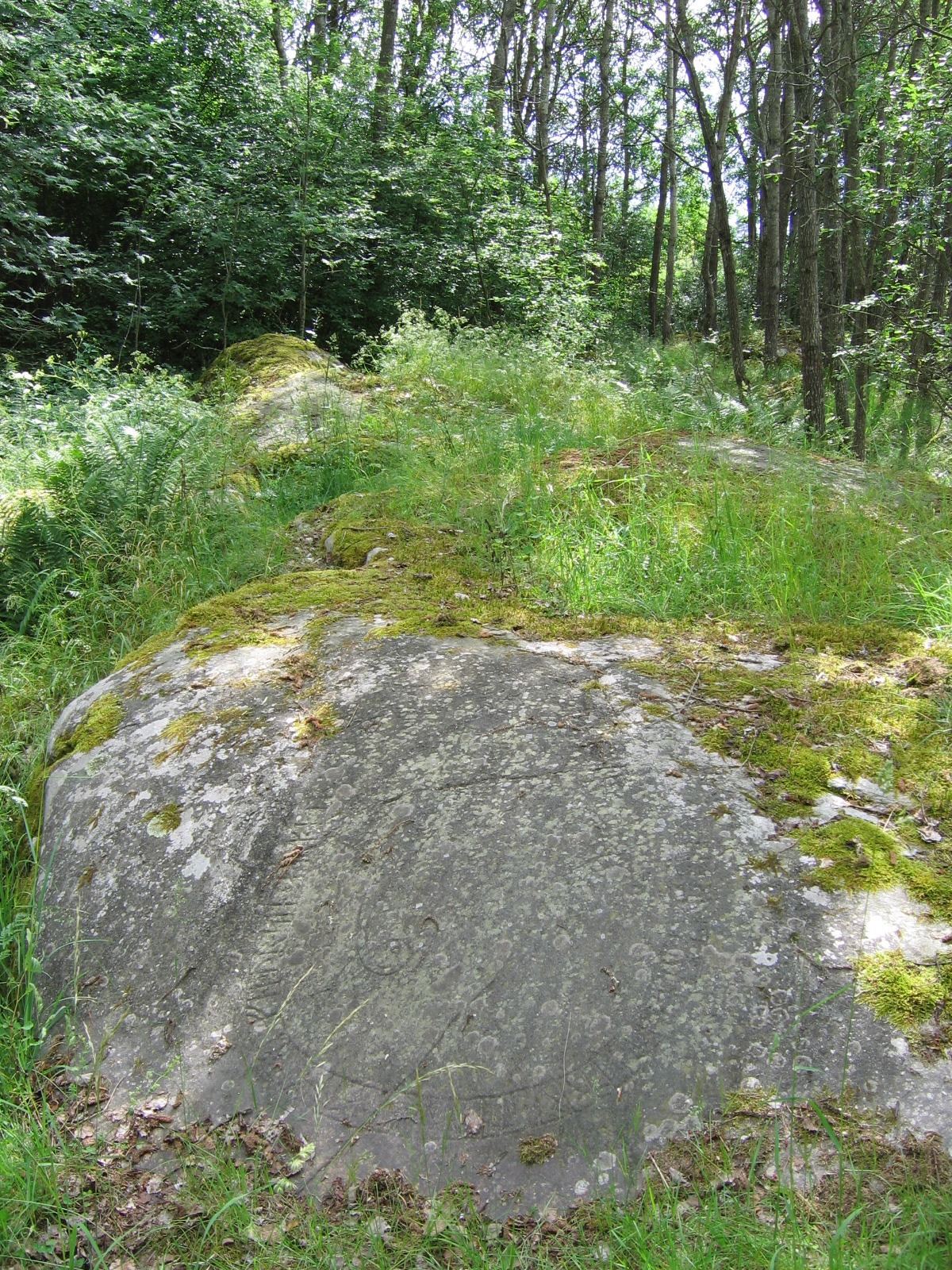
The rune inscriptions named U 309 (bottom), U 310 (top right) and U 311 (top left) have not been coloured recently.

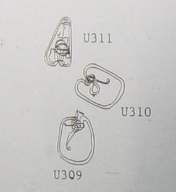
The Swedish National Heritage Board has placed a sign indicating the relative positions of the inscriptions.

The Hargs bro runic inscriptions, or U 309, U 310 and U 311, are 11th century Younger Futhark inscriptions in Old Norse on bedrock in Skånela Parish, Uppland, Sweden.

U 309 and U 310 constitute a twin monument in the style Pr4 and they are thus dated to the period 1060–1100. They belong to a group of c. 20 runestones called the Jarlabanke Runestones that are connected to the local strongman Jarlabanke and his clan. Together with the Broby bro Runestones and the Uppland Rune Inscriptions 101, 143 and 147 these particular runestones, however, treat the female matriarch of the clan called Estrid.

U 310 tells that Estrid had a husband named Ingvar, and he had a son prior to marrying Estrid, named Ragnvald who died. Estrid constructed a bridge, apparently a tradition in her family.

U 309 mentions Sigvid, Ingvar and Jarlabanke in a way that suggests that they are Estrid's sons. This Jarlabanke is not the same one as the Jarlabanke who raised the runestones in Täby, because he was the son of an Ingefast and a Jorun.

These runestones show a peculiarity to this family: the sons often have the same name as their fathers.

Estrid is the same person as the Estrid who is mentioned on a number of runestones in Täby and other locations (the Broby bro Runestones and Uppland Rune Inscriptions 101, 143 and 147). This Estrid was the maternal ancestor of a great clan called the Jarlabanke clan, and she was the maternal grandmother of the powerful Jarlabanke who claimed to own all of Täby.

The carver of the Snottsta runestone called U 329, where an Estrid and her brother Ragnfast are mentioned, is believed to be the runemaster named Fot who also made the runestones for the Jarlabanke clan. This strongly suggests that Estrid was born in Snottsta (also spelled Snåttsta), married Östen of Täby and married for the second time in Harg near Snottsta.

== U 309 ==
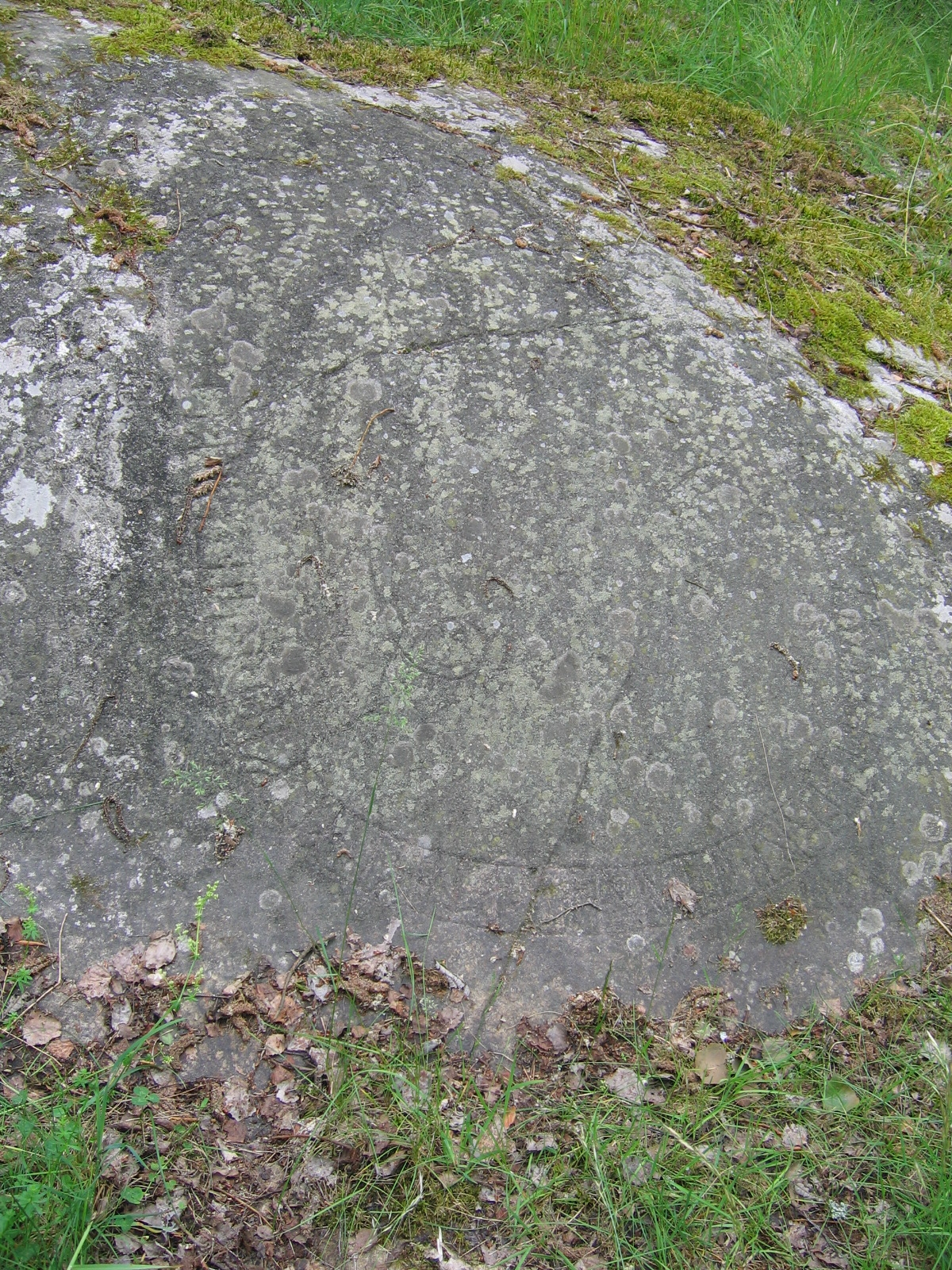
Like the other inscriptions at the location, U 309 was painted too long ago for any colour to remain.

This runic inscription is in the style Pr4 (second half of the 11th century) and it was made by Jarlabanke Ingvarsson and his brothers Sigviðr and Ingvarr in memory of their father Ingvarr and their brother Ragnvaldr.

× sikuiþr × auk × in[kua]r × auk × iarlabanki × litu × rista × runaʀ × at inkuar × faþur × sin × auk × at raknualt × broþur sin +
{} Sigviðr {} ok {} Ingvarr {} ok {} Iarlabanki {} letu {} rista {} runaʀ {} at Ingvar, {} faður {} sinn, {} ok {} at Ragnvald, {} broður sinn. {}
Sigviðr and Ingvarr and Jarlabanki had the runes carved in memory of Ingvarr, their father, and in memory of Ragnvaldr, their brother.

== U 310 ==
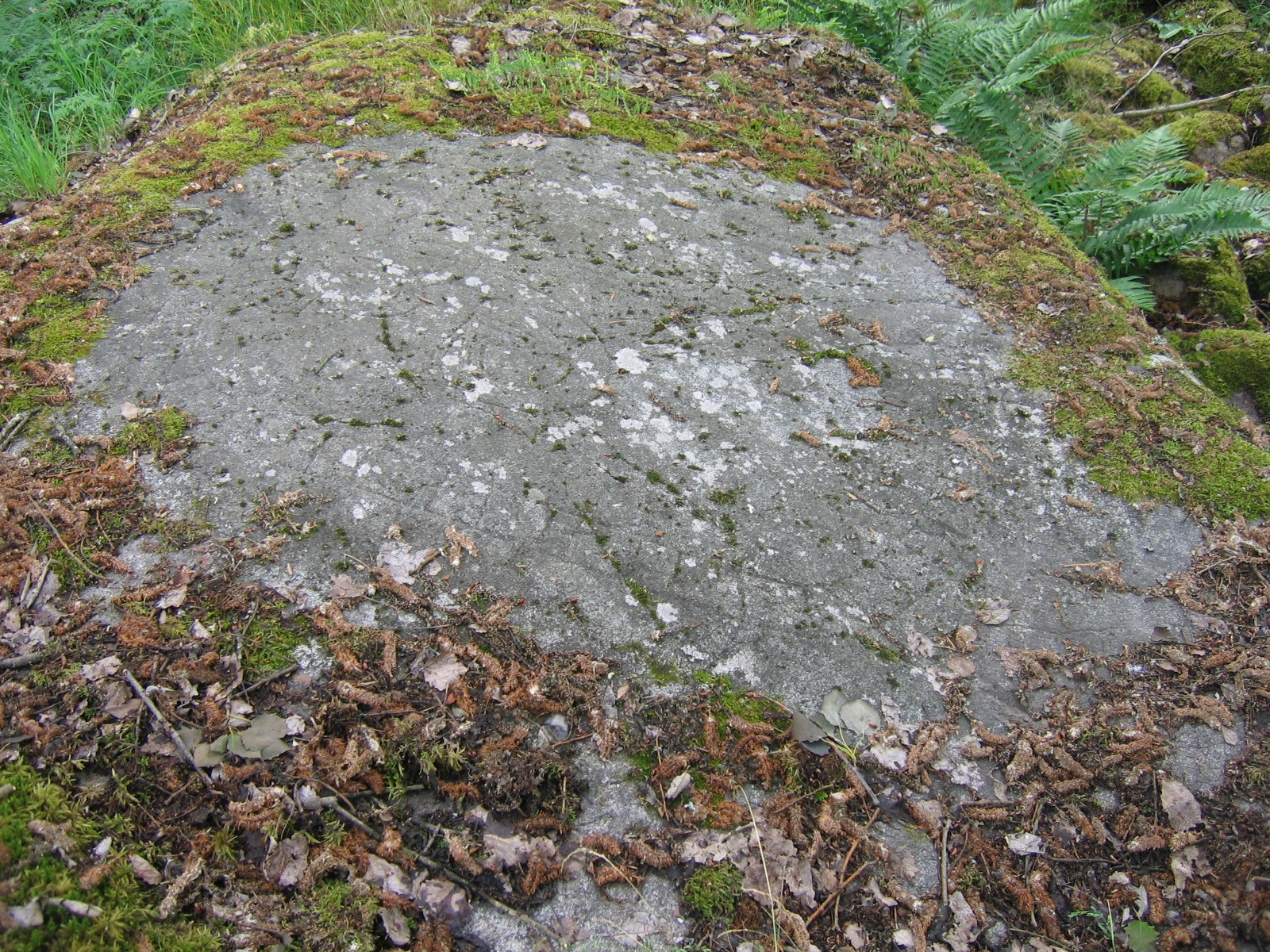
U 310.

Like the previous runic inscription, this inscription is in the style Pr4 (second half of the 11th century) and it was made in memory of Ingvarr and Ragnvaldr. However, this one was made on the orders of Estrid (Ástríðr), Ingvar's wife who was not Ragnvald's mother.

× estriþ × lit × bro × kiara × eftiʀ × ikuar × bonta × sin × auk × at raknualt × sun × hans ×
{} Æstrið {} let {} bro {} gæra {} æftiʀ {} Ingvar, {} bonda {} sinn, {} ok {} at Ragnvald, {} sun {} hans. {}
Ástríðr had the bridge made in memory of Ingvarr, her husbandman, and in memory of Ragnvaldr, his son.

== U 311 ==
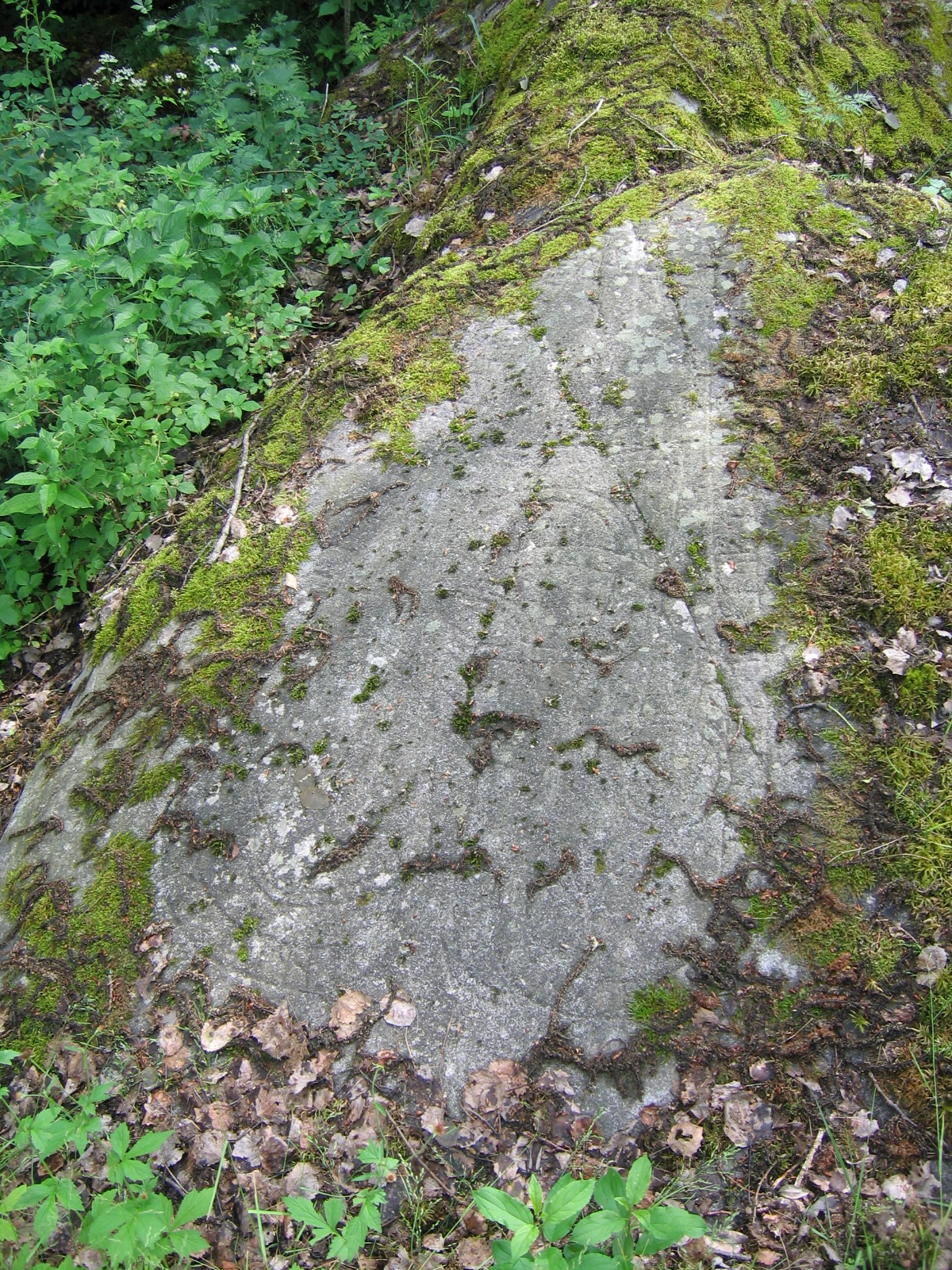
U 311.

This inscription was made later, and it is in the style Pr5 which dates it to the late 11th century or the early 12th century. It is not known how the people mentioned in it are related to those mentioned in the previous two inscriptions.

inkriþ ' lit ' kiara ' bro ' iftiʀ * inkikiari ' totur ' sin inkihualtr ' inkimar ' karl ' litu ' at ' systur s'i[n]
Ingrið {} let {} gæra {} bro {} æftiʀ {} Ingigærði, {} dottur {} sina. Ingivaldr, {} Ingimarr, {} Karl {} letu {} at {} systur sina.
Ingríðr had the bridge made in memory of Ingigerðr, her daughter. Ingivaldr (and) Ingimarr (and) Karl had (it made) in memory of their sister.

== Gallery ==
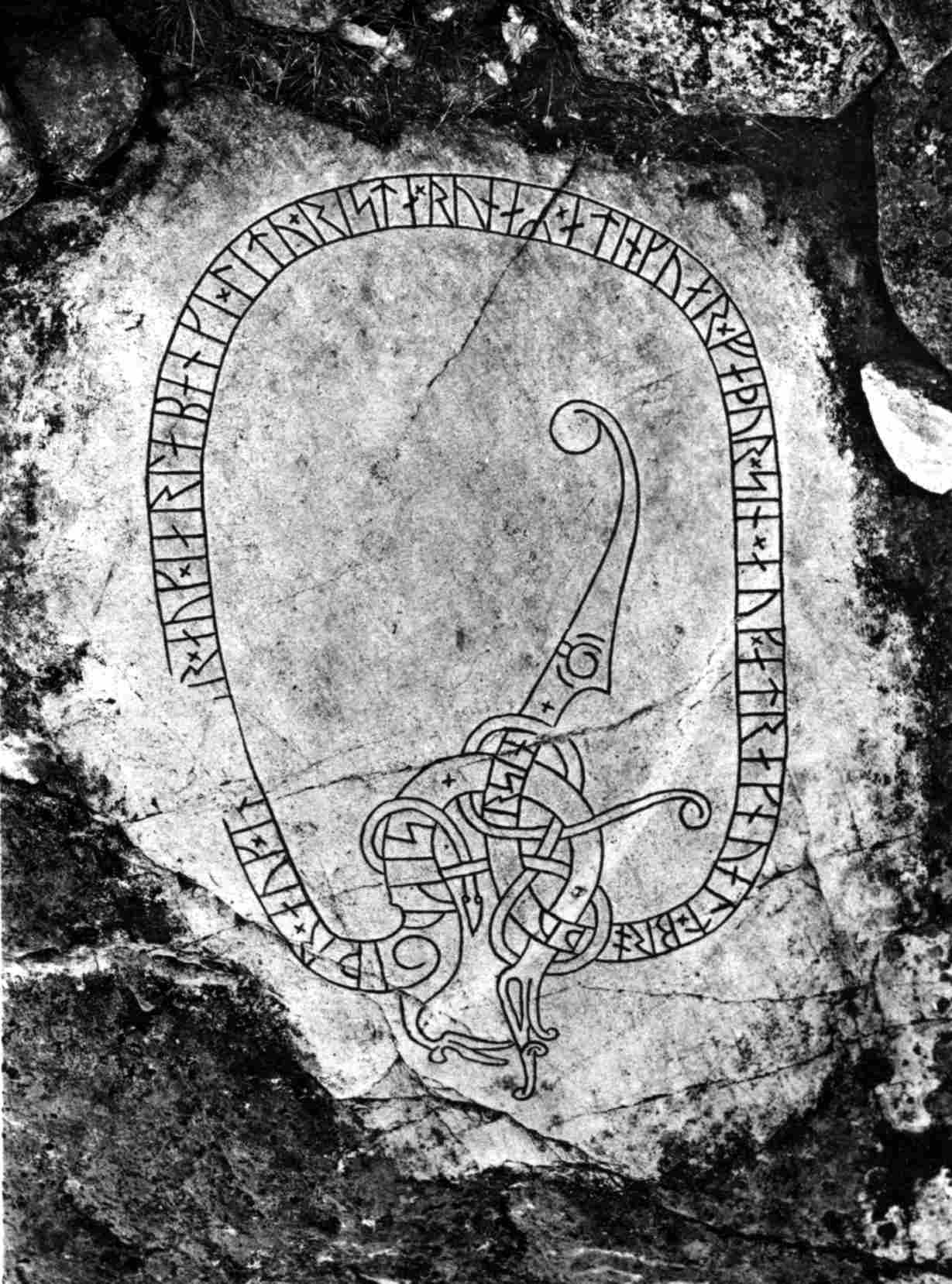
A picture from 1940, where U 309 has been painted.

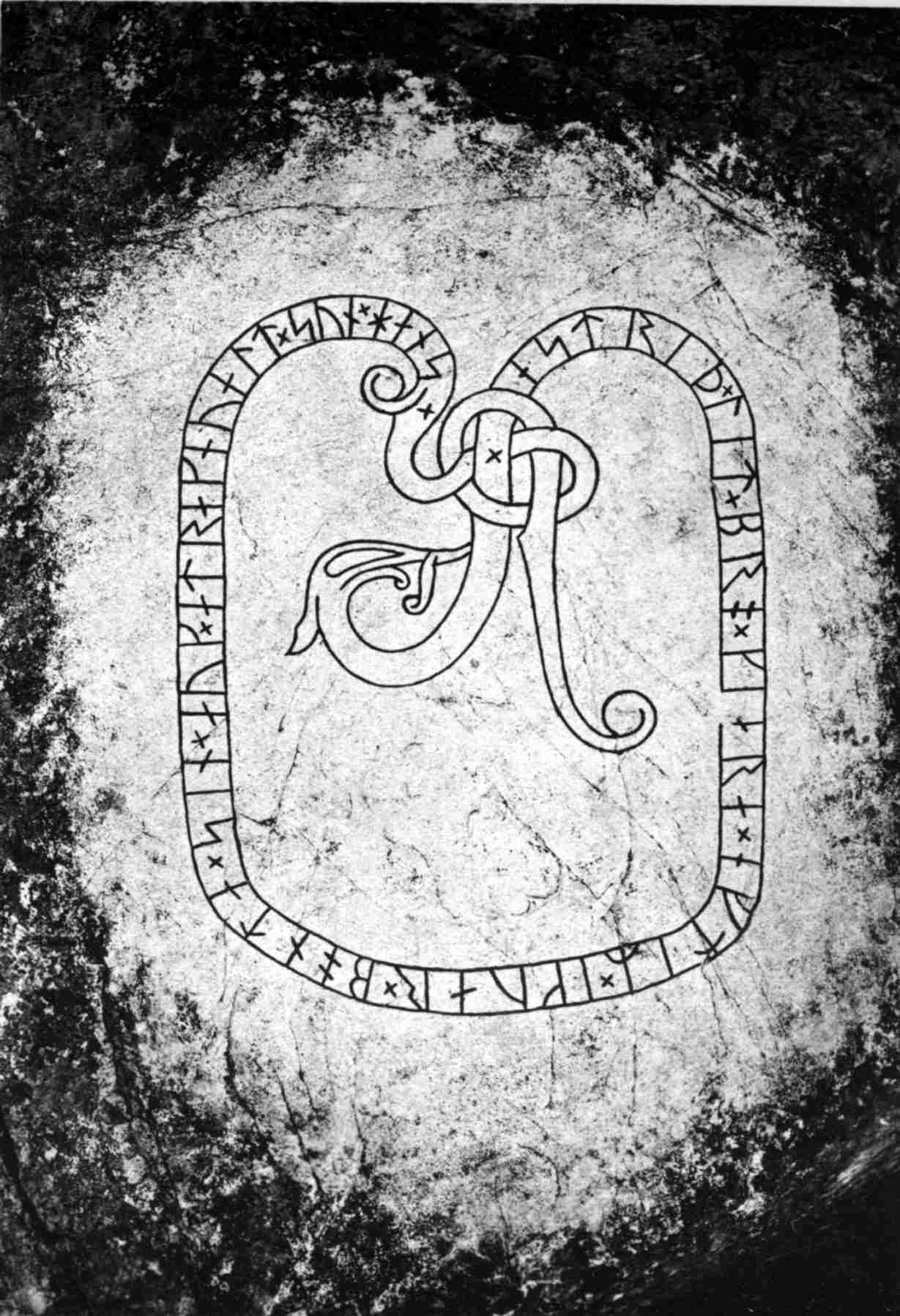
A picture from 1940, where U 310 has been painted.

== See also ==
- List of runestones

== Sources ==
- Rundata
- Inga och Estrid - en såpa för tusen år sedan: Människor, händelser och platser i Ingas och Estrids liv. A page at the Museum of Stockholm County website.
