= Estrid =

Swedish viking noble (11th-century)

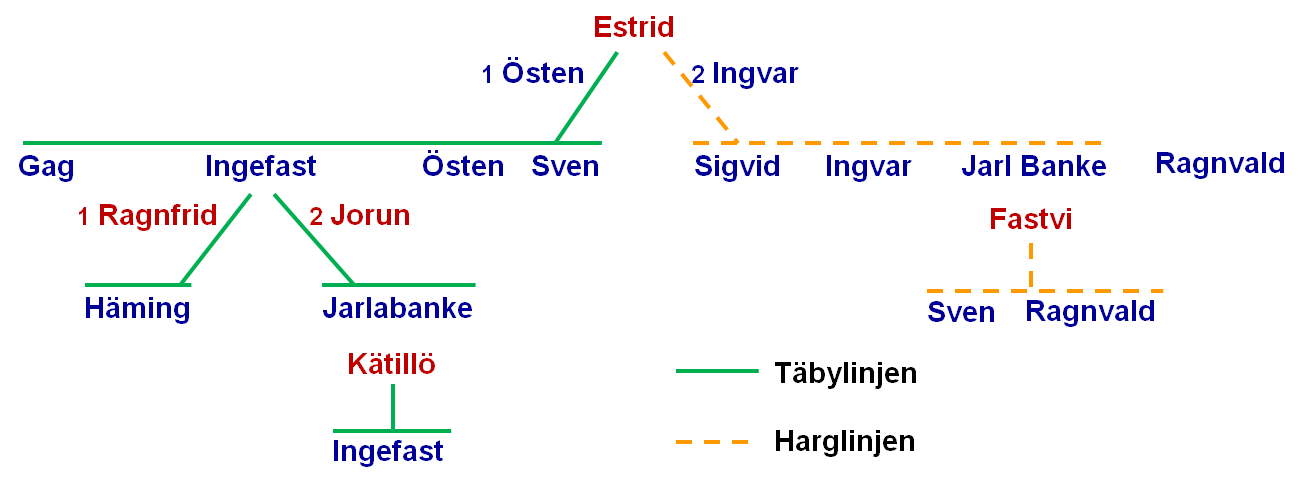

Estrid (Old Norse: Æstriðr, Ástríðr) was a rich and powerful 11th-century Swedish woman whose long family saga has been recorded on five or six runestones in Uppland, Sweden. This Estrid was the maternal grandmother of the chieftain Jarlabanke of the Jarlabanke clan. The family were rich landowners and belonged to the higher echelons of Swedish society. Her family saga has been the centre of a dramatisation at the Stockholm County Museum.

It is safe to assume that five of the 11 runestones that mention an Estrid in eastern Svealand refer to this Estrid because of the locations of the runestones and the people who are mentioned on them.

A sixth runestone, U 329, deals with an Estrid who is only mentioned as the sister of a Ragnfast and a Gyrid. This Ragnfast appears on the Hillersjö stone and the Snottsta and Vreta stones as the husband of Inga and the son-in-law of Gerlög. Since Fot, the runemaster of U 329, also made runestones for the Jarlabanke clan, and Gerlög and Inga also belonged to the same regional elite, it is probable that U 329 refers to the same Estrid as the five other runestones. This would mean that Estrid was born in Snottsta (also spelled Snåttsta) as the daughter of the rich landowner Sigfast.

The Broby bro Runestones tell that Estrid and her husband Östen had a son by the name Gag, who died while Östen still was alive, and three other sons named Ingefast, Östen and Sven. The runestones further tell that a barrow and a bridge were built and that two of the runestones were raised by the brothers Ingefast, Östen and Sven in memory of their father Östen, who had gone to Jerusalem and died in the Byzantine Empire.

The story of her life is continued on the Hargs bro runic inscriptions, where we learn that Estrid had married a man named Ingvar, and this Ingvar had a son prior to marrying Estrid whose name was Ragnvald. It also appears that Estrid and Ingvar had three sons named Sigvid, Ingvar and Jarlabanke. We further learn that Estrid had a bridge constructed, which apparently was a tradition in her family.

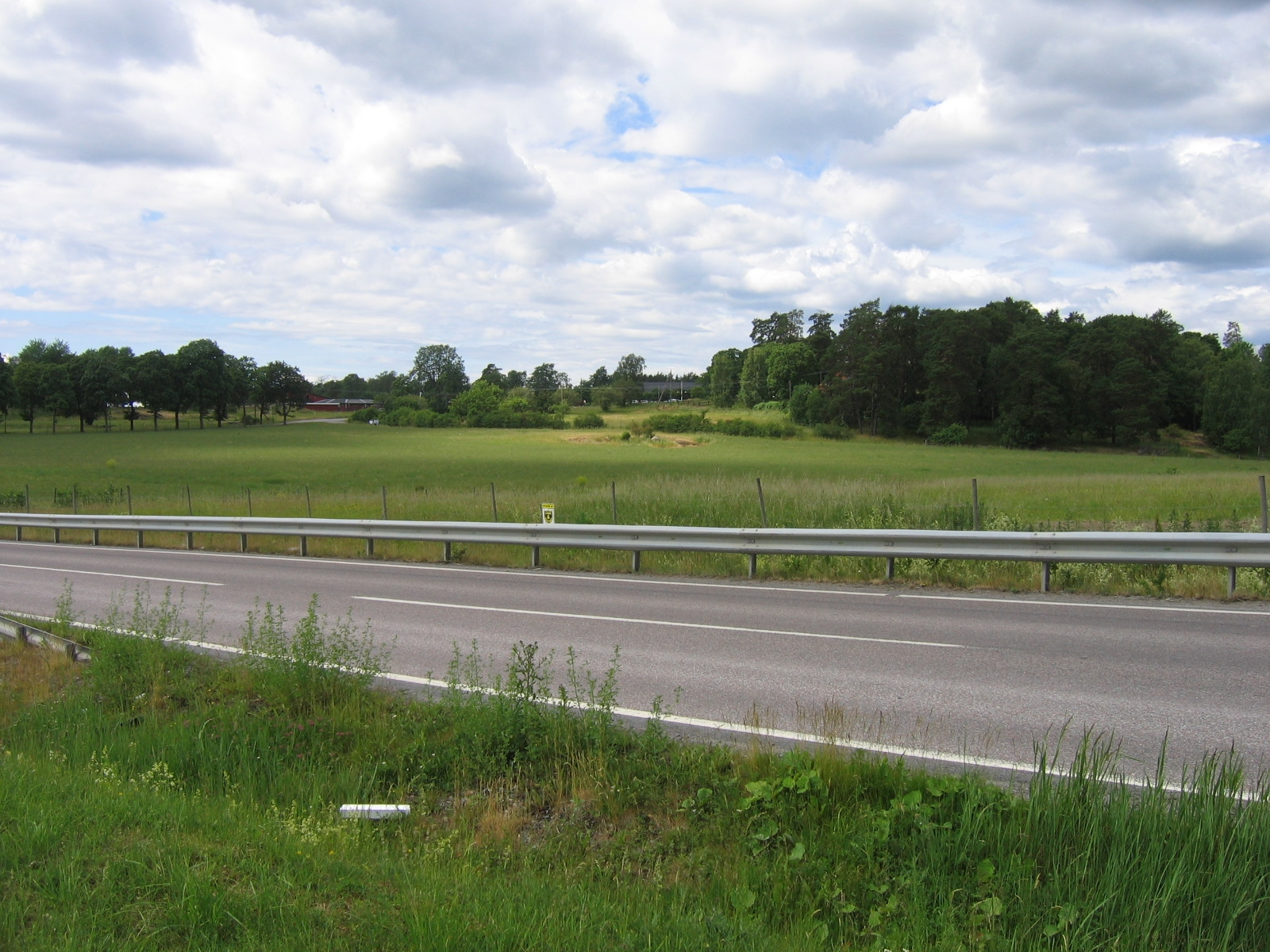
The location of the barrow and what was probably Estrid's grave was in the centre of the picture, just across the road.

She appears to have become quite old and moved back to Täby where she had family, because the last chapter of her life is documented on two runestones in south-western Täby. They tell that Estrid cleared a road and built bridges together with her grandson Jarlabanke (by her son Ingefast) and his family, and she dedicated the constructions to her sons Ingvar (her son with Ingvarr at Harg) and Ingefast (her son with Östen at Broby bro).

When Stockholm County Museum made an archaeological excavation at Broby bro, in 1995, they found three graves. The three were buried in Christian manner, i.e. with the head towards the west, they were not burned and there were few gifts. Some coins that were found helped to date the graves to the 11th century. One of the graves was located just beside Östen's barrow and it was for a rich and very old woman. The buried woman was probably Estrid.

== Family tree ==
Family tree

Ragnfastr	Gyríðr	Eysteinn	Ástríðr	Ingvarr
Gagr	Ingifastr	Eysteinn	Sveinn	Sigviðr	Ingvarr	Jarlabanki	Ragnvaldr

== See also ==
- List of runestones

== Sources and external links ==
- Rundata
- Inga och Estrid — en såpa för tusen år sedan: Människor, händelser och platser i Ingas och Estrids liv, Människor, händelser och platser i Ingas och Estrids liv, Stockholm County Museum.
- "Gerlögs berättelse — fakta och fiktion", Kulturarv Stockholm.
- Inga & Estrid — en såpa för tusen år sedan, Stockholm County Museum.
- Inga & Estrid — en såpa för tusen år sedan: Kan detta vara Estrid?, Stockholm County Museum.

== Bibliography ==
- Andersson, Lars. "Jarlabankes farmor Estrid: Fick hon sin sista vila vid Broby bro?" Populär arkeologi 17.2 (1999), 19–22.
- Hagerman, Maja, and Claes Gabrielsson (photos). Tusenårsresan. Stockholm: Prisma, 1999. pp. 147–157: "Estrid: Tiden är 1000-tal", the Jarlabanke family.
