= Ragnvald Ingvarsson =

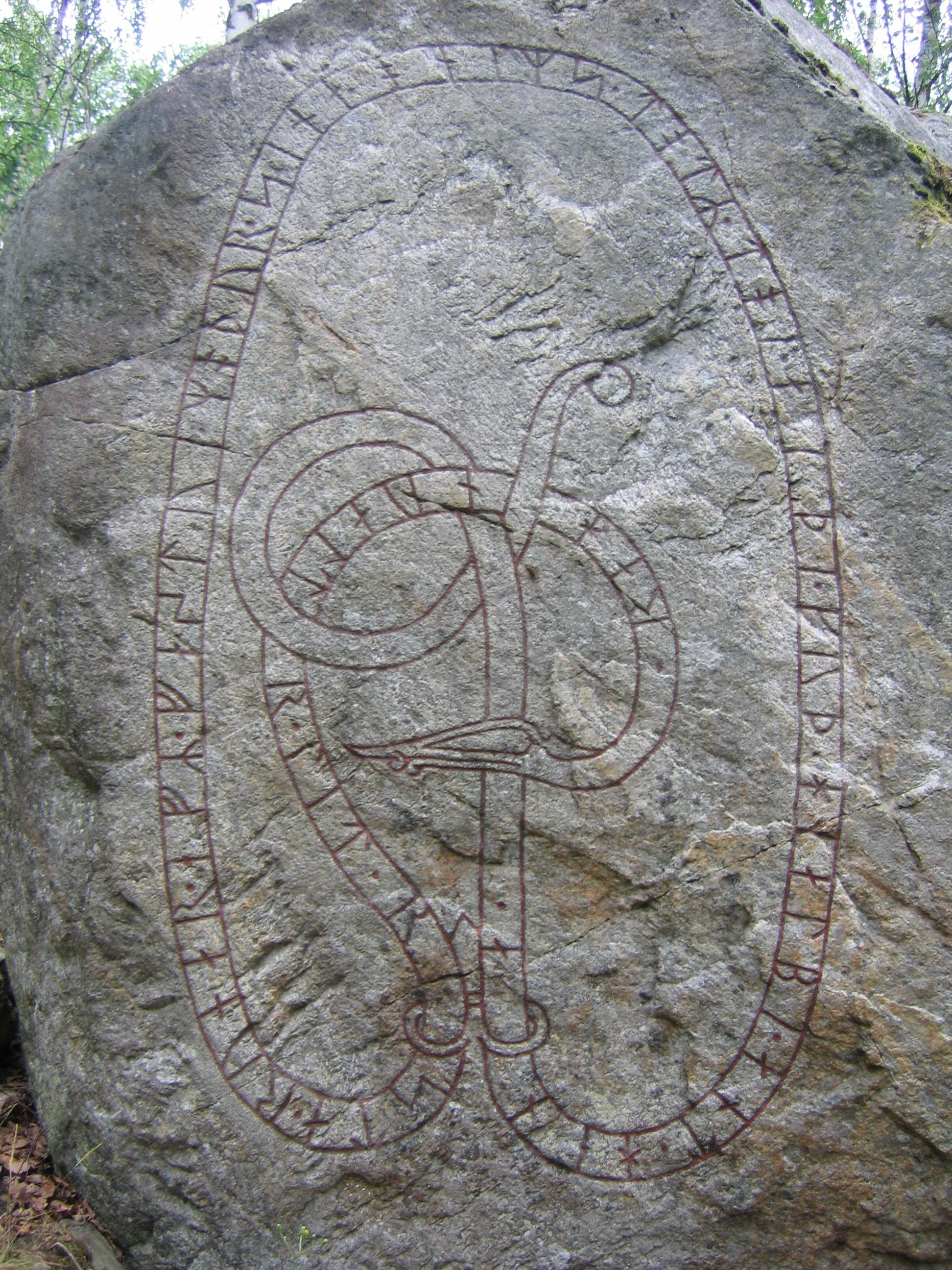
Side A of runestone U 112 at an old riding path near Ed church in Uppland, Sweden.

Ragnvaldr was a captain of the Varangian Guard in the first half of the 11th century. He may appear on several runestones, some of which suggest that he was the son of an Ingvar connecting him to the Jarlabanke clan.

In Ed, there are two runic inscriptions named U 112 A and B on a large boulder which measures 18 metres in circumference, located at a path called Kyrkstigen ("church path"). The inscriptions are in the style Pr4, and they were ordered by a former captain of the Varangian Guard named Ragnvaldr in memory of himself and his mother.

U 112 A: Ragnvaldr had the runes carved in memory of Fastvé, his mother, Ónæmr's daughter, (who) died in Eið. May God help her spirit.
U 112 B: Ragnvaldr had the runes carved; (he) was in Greece, was commander of the retinue.

Very few could return home with the honour of having been the captain of the Varangian guard, and his name Ragnvaldr shows that he belonged to the higher echelons of Old Norse society, suggesting that he was probably even a relative of the ruling dynasty.

This Ragnvaldr is identified with the Ragnvaldr whose death is announced on the runestones U 309 and U 310, which confirms him the son of Ingvar of the Jarlabanke clan. The inscription U 310 was made on the orders of Ingvar's second wife Estrid (Ástríðr, Æstriðr), who was not the mother of Ragnvaldr:

U 309: Sigviðr and Ingvarr and Jarlabanki had the runes carved in memory of Ingvarr, their father, and in memory of Ragnvaldr, their brother.
U 310: Ástríðr had the bridge made in memory of Ingvarr, her husbandman, and in memory of Ragnvaldr, his son.

Ragnvald's maternal grandfather Ónæmr is mentioned on two additional runestones in Uppland, U 328 and U 336. U 328 informs that Ragnvaldr had two aunts named Gyríðr and Guðlaug, and U 336 adds that Ulf of Borresta, who received three danegelds in England, was Ónæm's paternal nephew and thus Ragnvald's first cousin.

Omeljan Pritsak notes that Ragnvaldr appears to have died simultaneously with his father Ingvar and uncle Ingifastr, and that their death should have happened before 1050. He suggests that they died in the Rus'-Byzantine War of 1043, for which Vladimir of Novgorod had recruited Varangians.

== Sources ==
- Enoksen, Lars Magnar. (1998). Runor : historia, tydning, tolkning. Historiska Media, Falun. ISBN 91-88930-32-7
- Harrison, D. & Svensson, K. (2007). Vikingaliv. Fälth & Hässler, Värnamo. ISBN 978-91-27-35725-9
- Jansson, Sven B. (1980). Runstenar. STF, Stockholm. ISBN 91-7156-015-7
- Pritsak, Omeljan. (1981). The origin of Rus'. Cambridge, Mass.: Distributed by Harvard University Press for the Harvard Ukrainian Research Institute. ISBN 0-674-64465-4
- Rundata
