= Uppland Rune Inscriptions 101, 143 and 147 =

Runestone inscriptions

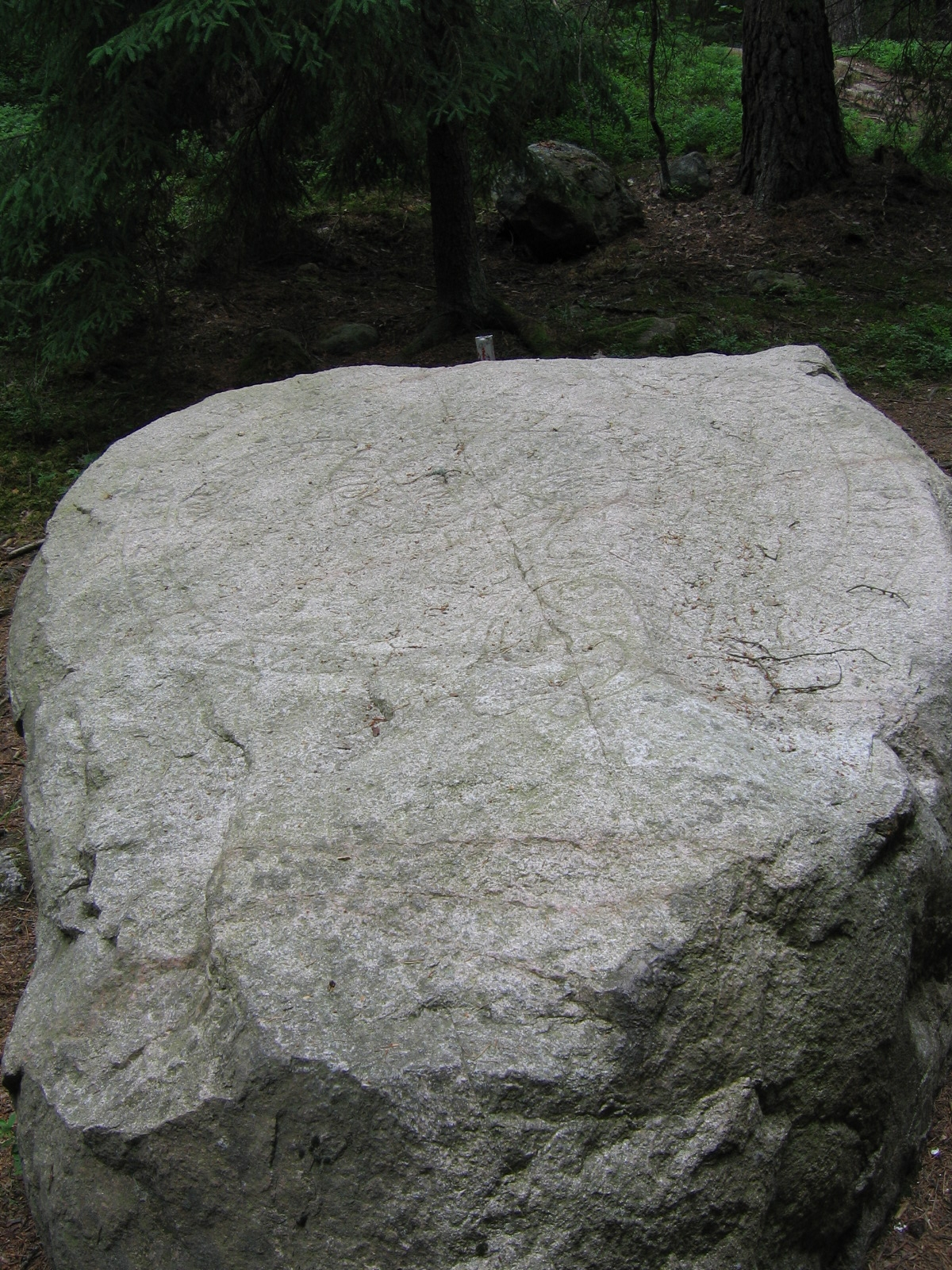
The runestone U 101 is deep in the forest at Södersätra near Stockholm. The stone has not been coloured in modern times.

The runestones known as U 101 is located in Sollentuna, and U 143 and U 147 are located in Täby; all three are in Uppland, Sweden. They are all in the style Pr4 and thus dated to the period 1060-1100 during which they were carved in connection with the construction of a road from Hagby to Ed at Edsviken. They belong to a group of c. 20 runestones called the Jarlabanke Runestones that are connected to the local chieftain Jarlabanke and his clan. Together with the Broby bro Runestones and the Hargs bro runic inscriptions these particular runestones, however, centre on the female matriarch of the clan called Estrid, who was the grandmother of Jarlabanke.

The runemaster of the Snottsta runestone called U 329, where an Estrid and her brother Ragnfast are mentioned, was Fot who also made the runestones for the Jarlabanke clan. This strongly suggests that Estrid was born in Snottsta (also spelled Snåttsta), married Östen of Täby and married for the second time in Harg near Snottsta.

The rune stones that are treated in this article tell that both Estrid's sons Ingvar (whom she had with Ingvar in Harg) and Ingefast (whom she had with Östen in Broby) had died.

The runestones give further information on her family. She evidently became quite old and is mentioned on the same runestones as her grandchildren, Häming and Jarlabanke. It also appears that she had had seven children and returned to the vicinity of Täby, and probably because there she had most of her children and grandchildren.

When Stockholm County Museum made an archaeological excavation at Broby bro, in 1995, they found three graves. The three were buried in the Christian tradition, that is, with the head facing west; also, they were not burned and there were few gifts. Some coins found helped to date the graves to the 11th century. One of the graves was of an old woman and she lay buried beside a barrow that one of the Broby bro Runestones says was raised for Estrid's first husband Östen. The buried woman may have been Estrid.

== U 101 ==
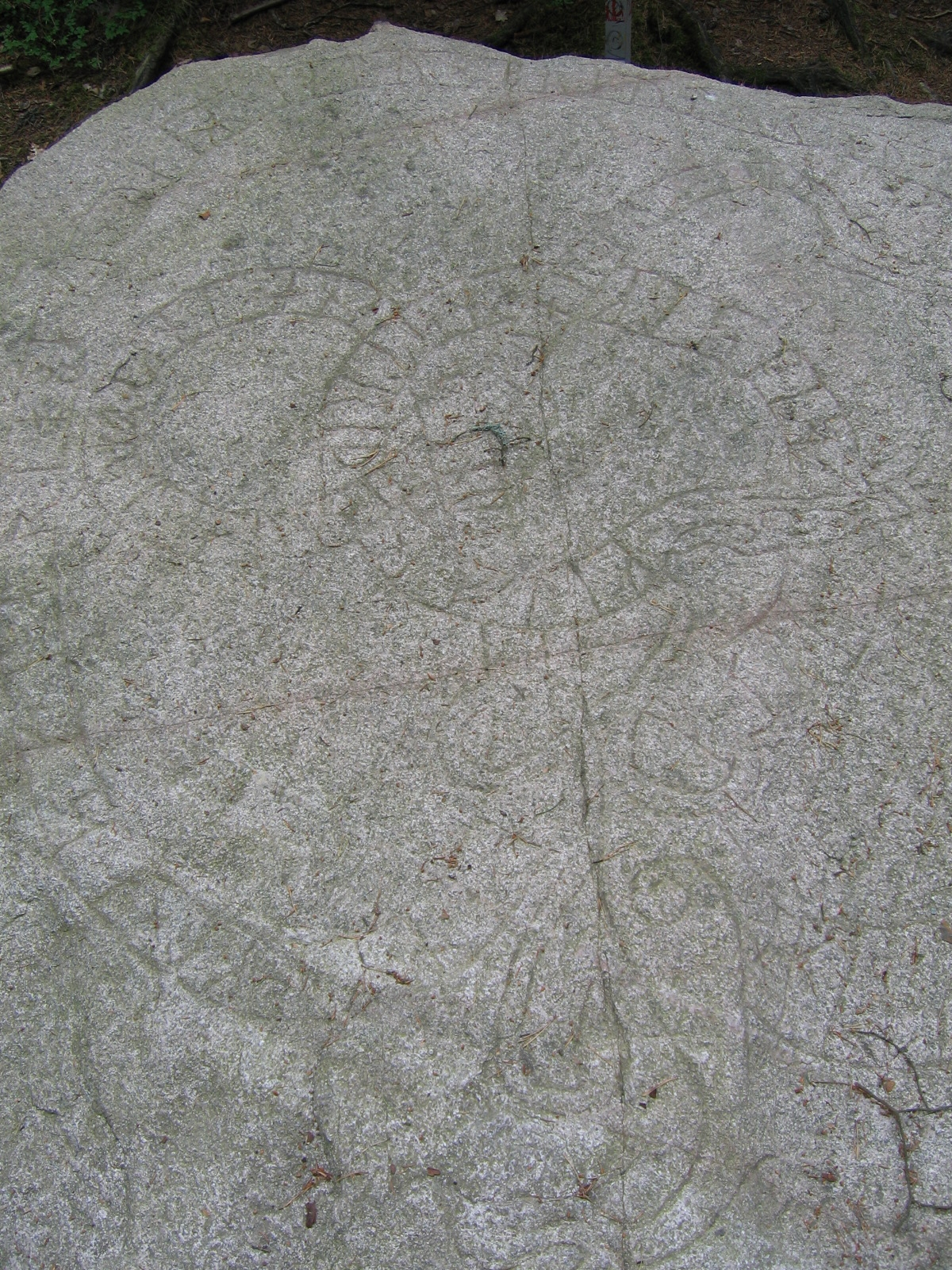
Closeup of U 101.

This rune stone in the style Pr4 (second half of the 11th century) is found on a boulder in the forest beside a trail along which there are several Jarlabanke rune stones. It has been carved on the orders of Estrid and her grandchildren Jarlabanke and Häming (Hemingr) in memory of her sons Ingifastr (Jarlabanke's and Hemingr's father) and Ingvar. Ingifastr is her son together with Eysteinn (Östen, who is mentioned together with Ingifastr on the Broby bro Runestones) and Ingvar probably refers to the son she had with the husband by the same name (both Ingvars are mentioned on the Hargs bro runic inscriptions).

× henmikr × auk × iarlabaki × þaiʀ × litu × braut + ryþia × auk × broaʀ × kiara × eftiʀ × faþur × sin × auk × estriþ × eftiʀ suni × sina × inkifast × auk × inkuar + kuþ × hialbi × ant × þaiʀa ×
{} Hæmingʀ {} ok {} Iarlabanki {} þæiʀ {} letu {} braut {} ryðia {} ok {} broaʀ {} giæra {} æftiʀ {} faður {} sinn {} ok {} Æstrið {} æftiʀ syni {} sina {} Ingifast {} ok {} Ingvar. {} Guð {} hialpi {} and {} þæiʀa. {}
Hemingr and Jarlabanki, they had the path cleared and the bridges made in memory of their father; and Ástríðr in memory of her sons Ingifastr and Ingvarr. May God help their spirits.

== U 143 ==
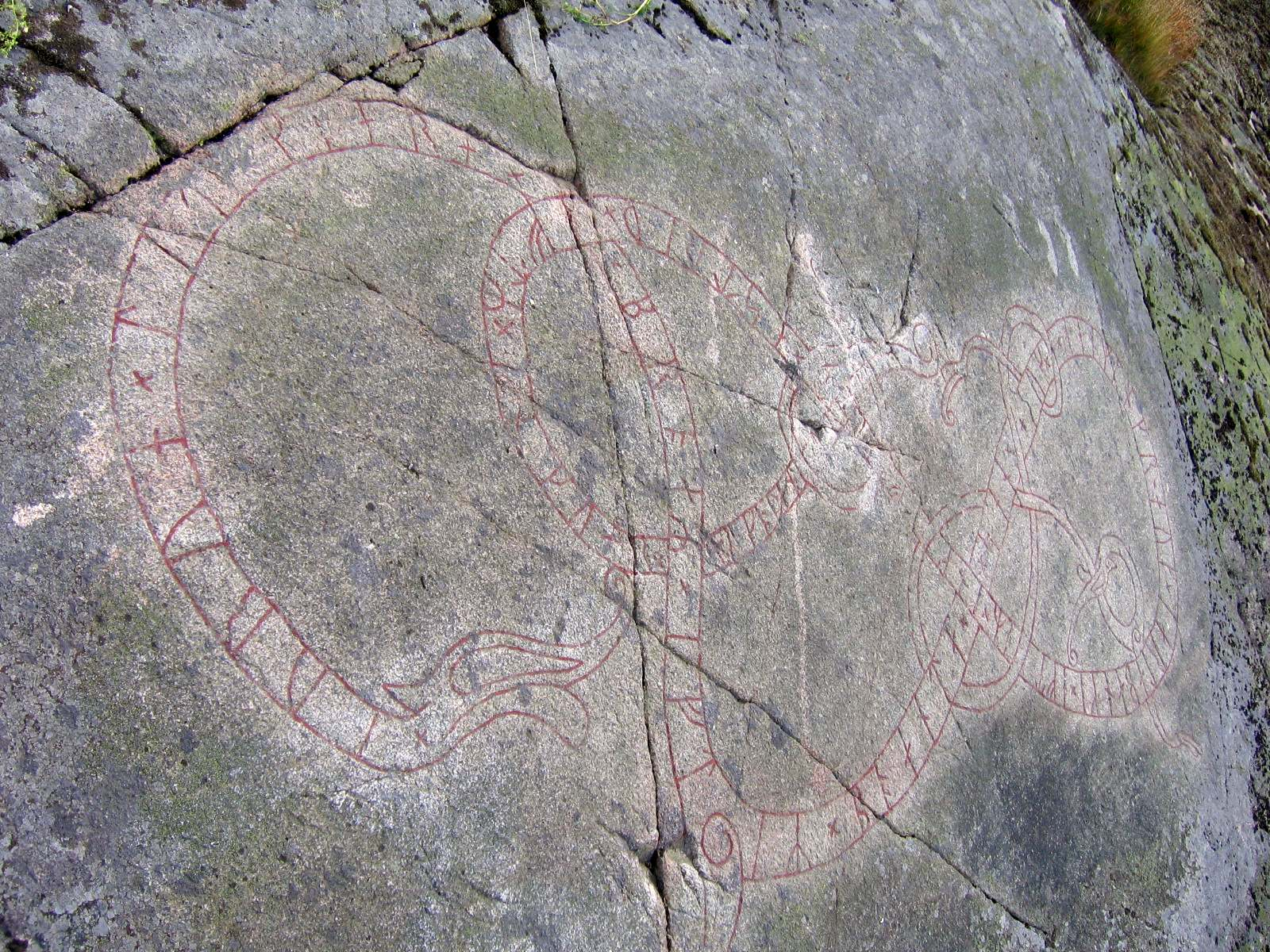
The runestone U 143.

This is not properly a rune stone, but a runic inscription in the style Pr4 (second half of the 11th century) on flat bedrock on the property of the farm of Hagby. It was carved in memory of two men. Estrid had it made in memory of Ingvar (see above), while her grandchildren Hemingr and Jarlabanke and their mother Jórunn (Estrid's daughter-in-law) had it made in memory of Ingifastr, their father and husband, and Estrid's son.

× iurun × lit × kiara ×× broaʀ × iftiʀ × boanta ×× sen ×× auk ×× henminkr × auk × iarlabanki × eftiʀ × ink[i]fast × estriþ × iftʀ × inkuar × alkoþan × trenk
{} Iorun {} let {} gærva {} broaʀ {} æftiʀ {} boanda {} senn {} ok {} Hæmingʀ {} ok {} Iarlabanki {} æftiʀ {} Ingifast, {} Æstrið {} æftiʀ {} Ingvar, {} allgoðan {} dræng.
Jórunnr had the bridges made in memory of her husbandman; and Hemingr and Jarlabanki in memory of Ingifastr; Ástríðr in memory of Ingvarr, an excellent valiant man.

== U 147 ==
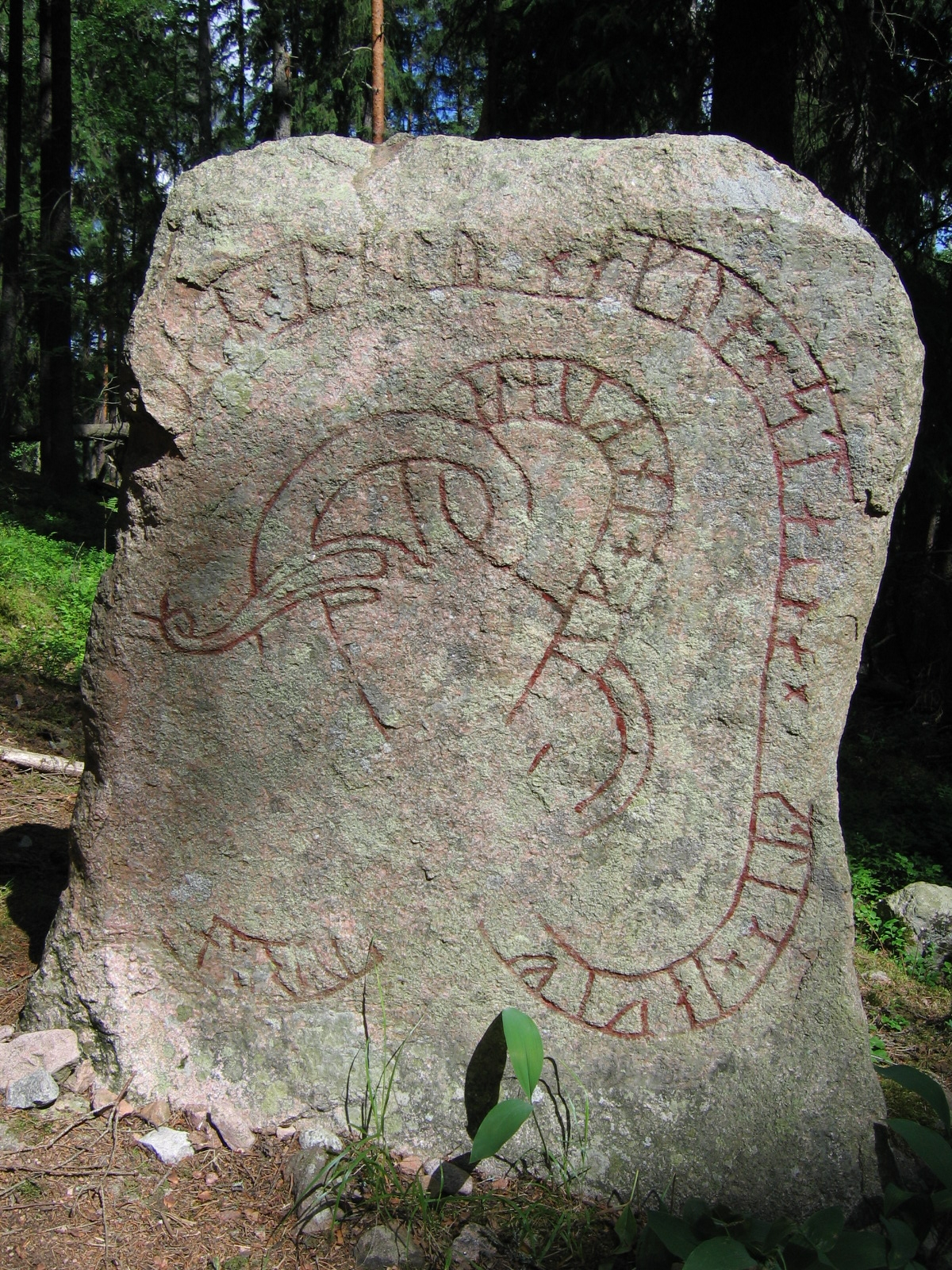
The runestone U 147.

This damaged rune stone in the style Pr4 (second half of the 11th century) is located only a few hundred metres from U 148. It was made in memory of Ingifastr and Ingvar like the previous two stones, but only Jórunn's name remains among the ones who had the stone made. The personal pronoun þaʀ is the feminine form for "they", in Old Norse, and it shows that Jórunn had the stone made together with another lady. The fact that it is dedicated to Estrid's son Ingvar and the fact that there are remains of the runes tr point to Jórunn's mother-in-law Estrid as the second lady who had the stone made.

-(u)(r)(u)(n) ...(t)(r)... þaʀ × litu × hakua × staina × --ti- × iakif... -uk + inkuar
[I]orunn ... þaʀ {} letu {} haggva {} stæina {} [æf]ti[ʀ] {} Ingif[ast] ok {} Ingvar.
Jórunnr ... they had the stones cut in memory of Ingifastr and Ingvarr.

== See also ==
- List of runestones

== Sources ==
- Inga och Estrid - en såpa för tusen år sedan: Människor, händelser och platser i Ingas och Estrids liv. A page at the Museum of Stockholm County.
