= Snottsta and Vreta stones =

Coordinates: 59°37′N 18°07′E

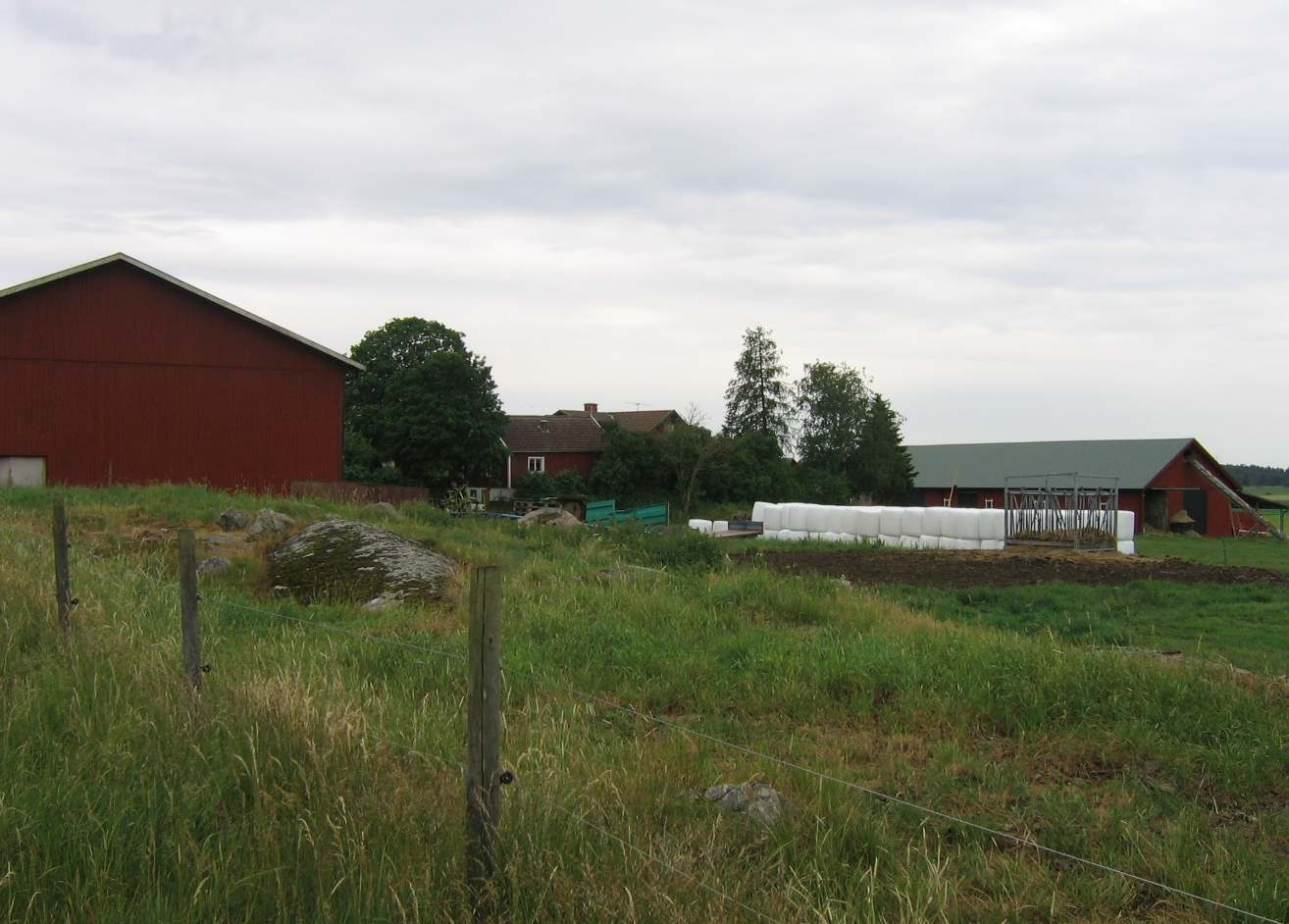
The farm Snottsta or Snåttsta, Old Norse: Snotastaðir, is still in the same spot, 1000 years after the rune stones were made as documentation of the rights of property of the estate.

The Snottsta and Vreta stones are individual runestones known as U 329, U 330, U 331 and U 332. They are found on the homesteads of Snottsta (also spelled Snåttsta) and Vreta, and they tell in Old Norse with the younger futhark about the family story of Gerlög and Inga in 11th century Uppland, Sweden, together with the Hillersjö stone (U 29) and the runestone U 20/21.

The inscriptions are classified as being carved in the runestone style Pr3, which suggests that they were carved in the period 1050–1080. They were carved first, then U 20/21, and last Gerlög's Hillersjö stone.

The four runestones say that Ragnfast, Inga's husband has died. Ragnfast was the sole inheritor of the homestead Snottsta after his father Sigfast. The runestone standing at Vreta gives the central information "she inherited her child". This statement agrees with what is said on the Hillersjö stone (U 29), which is that Inga inherited her son, a son who was not named, probably because he was very young. The central message of these runestones is that Inga inherited Snottsta after Ragnfast died.

Further information which is provided by the runestones is that Ragnfast had a housecarl named Assur. Why this is important is not mentioned, but it is likely that Assur had a strong position in the clan and may have inherited some of Ragnfast's property.

Furthermore, the runestone U 329 contains some information about a third and a fourth woman, Estrid and Gyrid. It says that Ragnfast is the brother of Gyrid and Estrid, and the reason why this is mentioned is possibly because there was a disagreement about the inheritance. What is clear is that they are mentioned to explain how they relate to Inga.

Estrid is probably the same person as the Estrid who is mentioned on a number of the Jarlabanke Runestones in Täby and other locations (Broby bro Runestones, Hargs bro runic inscriptions and Uppland Rune Inscriptions 101, 143 and 147). This Estrid was the maternal ancestor of a great clan called the Jarlabanke clan, and she was the maternal grandmother of the powerful Jarlabanke who claimed to own all of Täby. The inscription on U 329, where Ragnfast's sister Estrid is mentioned, has been attributed to the runemaster named Fot who also made the runestones for the Jarlabanke clan. This strongly suggests that Estrid was born in Snottsta, married Östen of Täby and married for the second time in Harg near Snottsta.

== U 329 ==
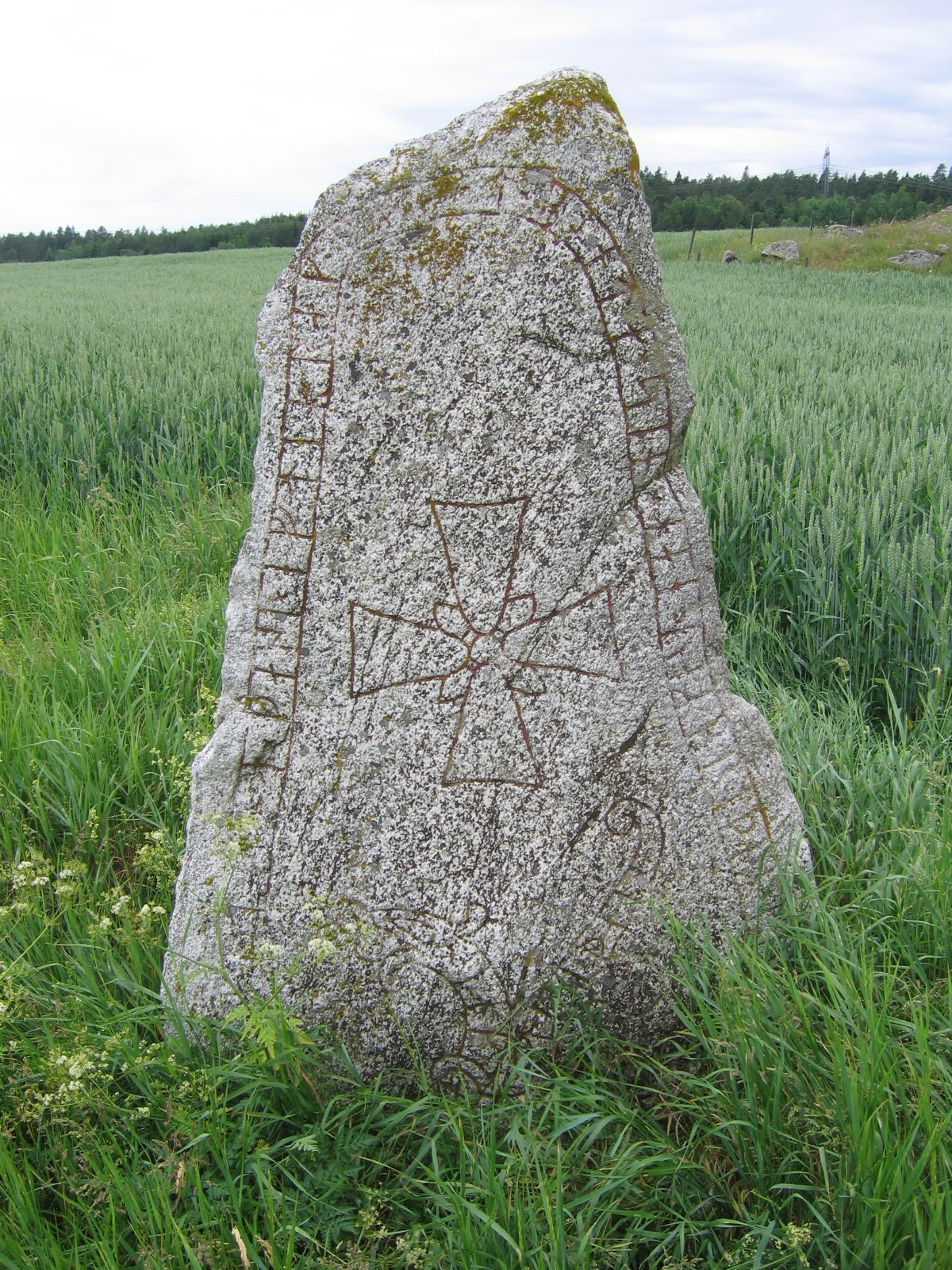
U 329.

This rune stone is raised beside a field along a dirt road. It was raised by Inga in memory of her husband Ragnfastr, and it mentions his two sisters Gyríðr and Ástríðr. This should be compared to U 331, below, which says that Ragnfastr was the only heir of the property and U 332 which says that Inga inherited her and Ragnfastr's children. Among the three women, it was Inga who eventually owned Snottsta.

× inka × lit × raisa × staina × þasi × eftiʀ × raknfast × bonta × sin × han × uaʀ × broþiʀ × kuriþaʀ × auk × estriþaʀ ×
{} Inga {} let {} ræisa {} stæina {} þasi {} æftiʀ {} Ragnfast, {} bonda {} sinn. {} Hann {} vaʀ {} broðiʀ {} Gyriðaʀ {} ok {} Æstriðaʀ. {}
Inga had these stones raised in memory of Ragnfastr, her husbandman. He was Gyríðr's and Ástríðr's brother.

== U 330 ==
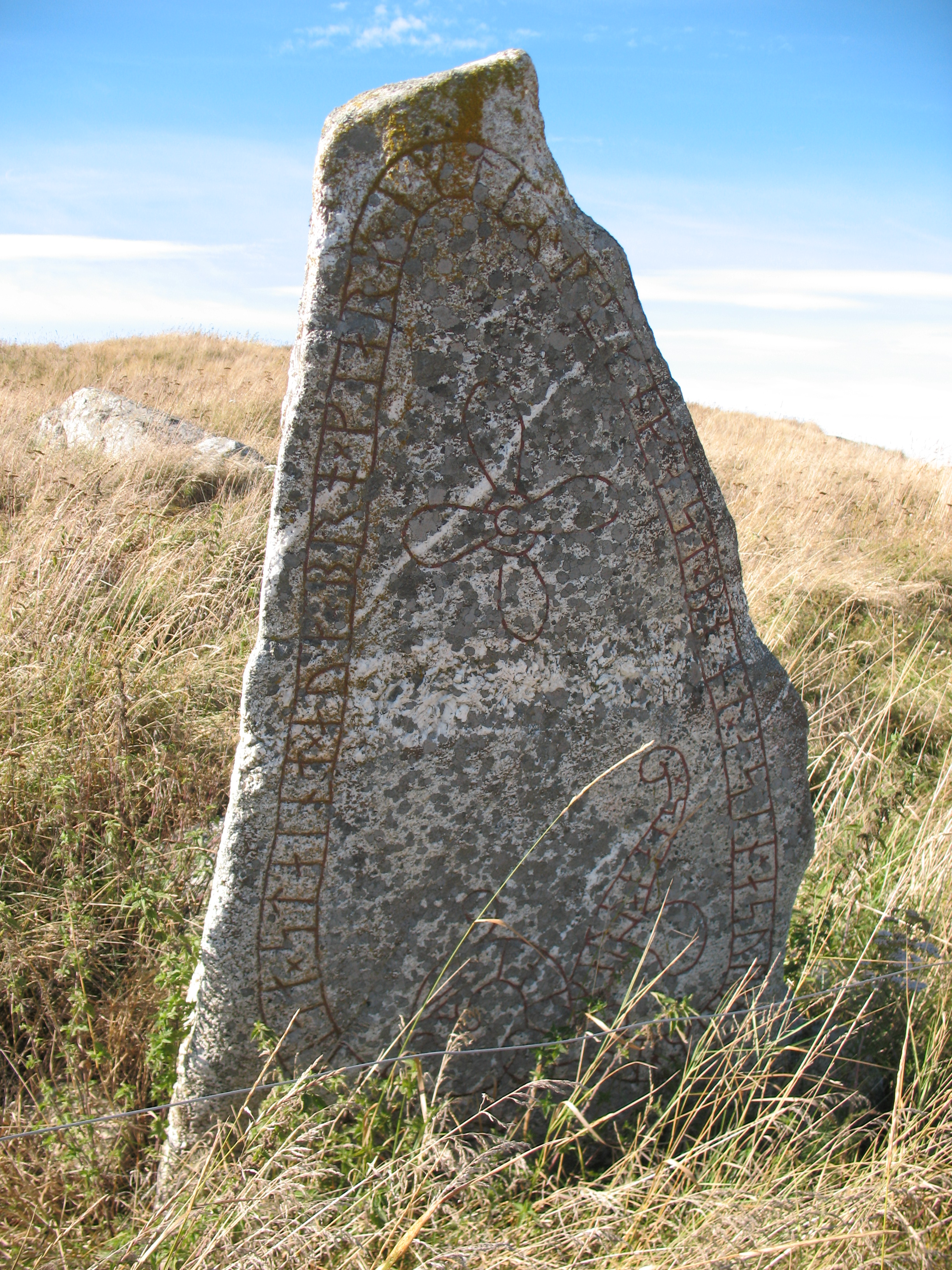
U 330.

This rune stone is raised at the foot of a hill in the centre of a field. It tells that Inga had it made together with a bridge and other stones (U 329 and possibly others that have disappeared) in honour of her husband Ragnfastr. It adds Assurr/Özurr, who was Ragnfastr's housecarl (a professional warrior), and it is probably to show visitors that Assurr was an important and valued person at the estate, and who probably had rights of inheritance. Assurr is identified with Andsvarr (an allomorph of Özurr and Assur) who was commemorated by his daughter Guðlaug on U 328, and Guðlaug may be the same Guðlaug as the one who raised the runestones U 133 and U 141 in memory of her son Holmi who fell in Italy, and who would be Assur's son.

× inka × lit × raisa × staina × auk × bro × kiara × eftiʀ × raknfast × bont×a sin × asur × uaʀ × huskarl × hans ×
{} Inga {} let {} ræisa {} stæina {} ok {} bro {} gærva {} æftiʀ {} Ragnfast, {} bonda sinn. {} Assurr {} vaʀ {} huskarl {} hans. {}
Inga had the stones raised and the bridge made in memory of Ragnfastr, her husbandman. Ǫzurr was his housecarl.

== U 331 ==
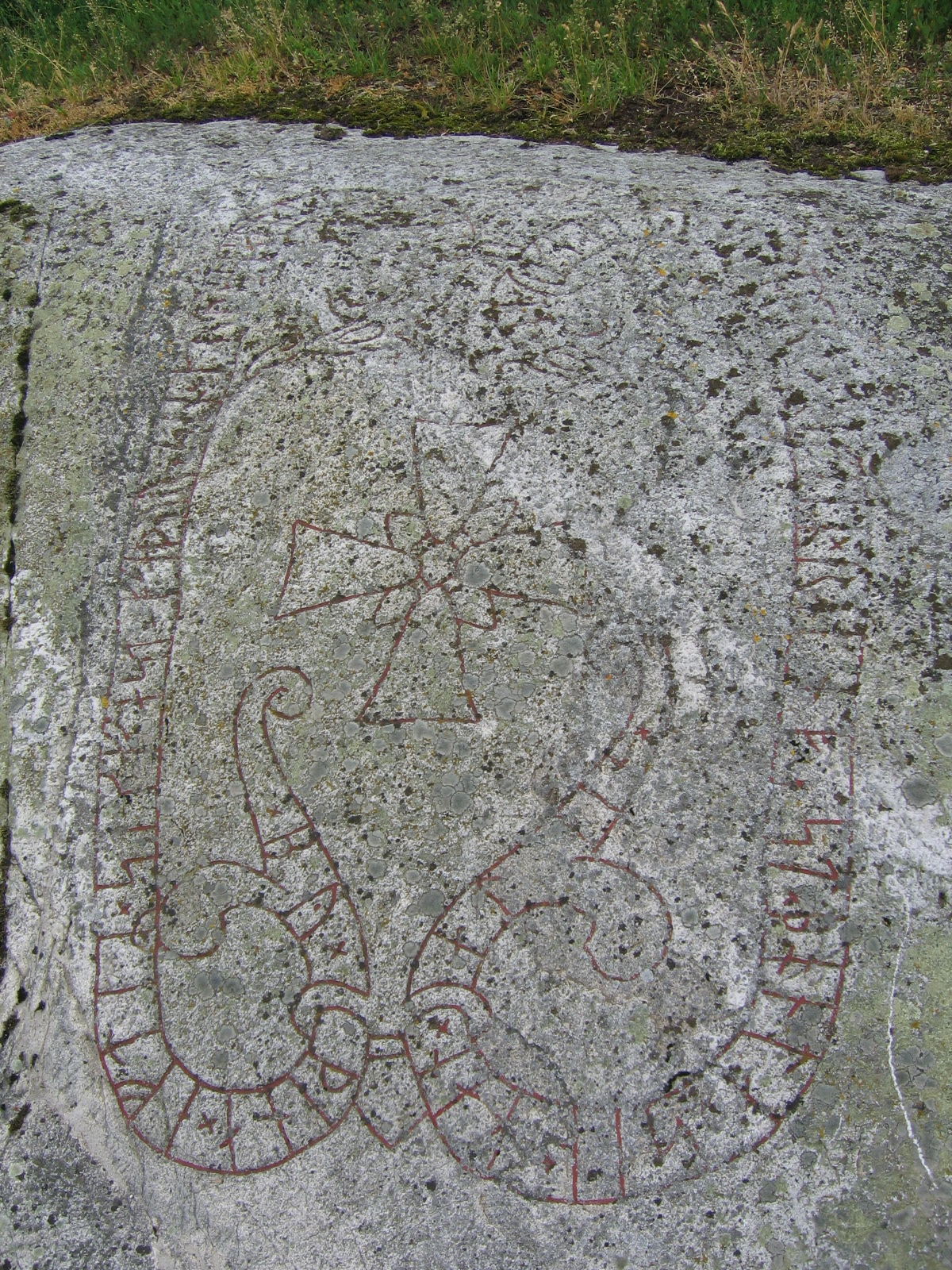
U 331.

U 331 is not a rune stone, but a flat rock on which the inscription has been written down. In this inscription Inga told that her husband Ragnfastr had died and that he was the sole inheritor of his father Sigfastr. This should be compared with U 329, where his sisters are mentioned, sisters who consequently did not inherit their father.

× inka × lit × rista × runaʀ × eftiʀ × raknfast × bonta × sin + han × at[i +] ain ×× by × þina × eftiʀ × sikfast × faþur × sin × kuþ × hialbi × ant þaiʀa ×
{} Inga {} let {} rista {} runaʀ {} æftiʀ {} Ragnfast, {} bonda {} sinn. {} Hann {} atti {} æinn {} by {} þenna {} æftiʀ {} Sigfast, {} faður {} sinn. {} Guð {} hialpi {} and þæiʀa. {}
Inga had the runes carved in memory of Ragnfastr, her husbandman. He alone owned this estate after Sigfastr, his father. May God help their spirits.

== U 332 ==
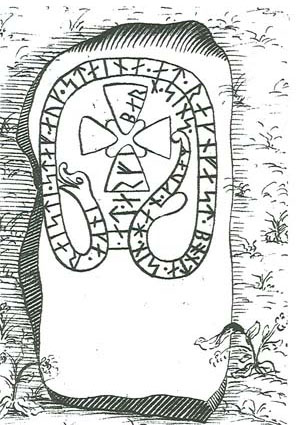
The 18th century drawing.

The runestone at Vreta, U 332, has disappeared. Its inscription and designs are, however, known thanks to an 18th-century drawing. This rune stone was also raised by Inga, and it adds that both her husband Ragnfastr and their children were dead, as she had inherited them. The text also states that a staff was raised in memory of Ragnfastr. Other inscriptions that indicate that a staff was raised include Sö 196 in Kolsundet, Vs 1 in Stora Ryttern, U 226 in Bällsta, and the now-lost U 849 in Balingsta. On three other inscriptions, DR 40 in Randbøl, Sm 16 in Nöbbele, and Sö 56 in Fyrby, the word "staff" may refer to the staves of the runes in the text. The Hillersjö stone (U 29) ends the family saga by telling that Inga had died without living children and that the property had passed to her mother Gerlög on the island of Färingsö.

inka * raisti * staf * auk * staina * at * raknfast * bonta * sin * han * kuam * at * arfi barn * sins *
Inga {} ræisti {} staf {} ok {} stæina {} at {} Ragnfast, {} bonda {} sinn. {} H[o]n {} kvam {} at {} arfi barns {} sins. {}
Inga raised the staff and stones in memory of Ragnfastr, her husbandman. She came to inherit from her children.

== See also ==
- List of runestones

== Sources ==
- Pritsak, Omeljan (1981). The Origin of Rus'. Cambridge, Mass.: Distributed by Harvard University Press for the Harvard Ukrainian Research Institute. ISBN 0-674-64465-4
- Zilmer, Kristel (2005). "He Drowned in Holmr's Sea – His Cargo-Ship Drfted to the Sea-Bottom, Only Three Came Out Alive": Records and Representations of Baltic Traffic in the Viking Age and Early Middle Ages in Early Nordic Sources (PDF) (Thesis). Tartu University Press. ISBN 9949-11-090-4. Archived from the original (PDF) on 2011-07-20.
- Inga och Estrid - en såpa för tusen år sedan: Människor, händelser och platser i Ingas och Estrids liv. A webpage of the Museum of Stockholm County.
