= Broby bro Runestones =

Part of Jarlabanke group

Coordinates: 59°29′N 18°02′E

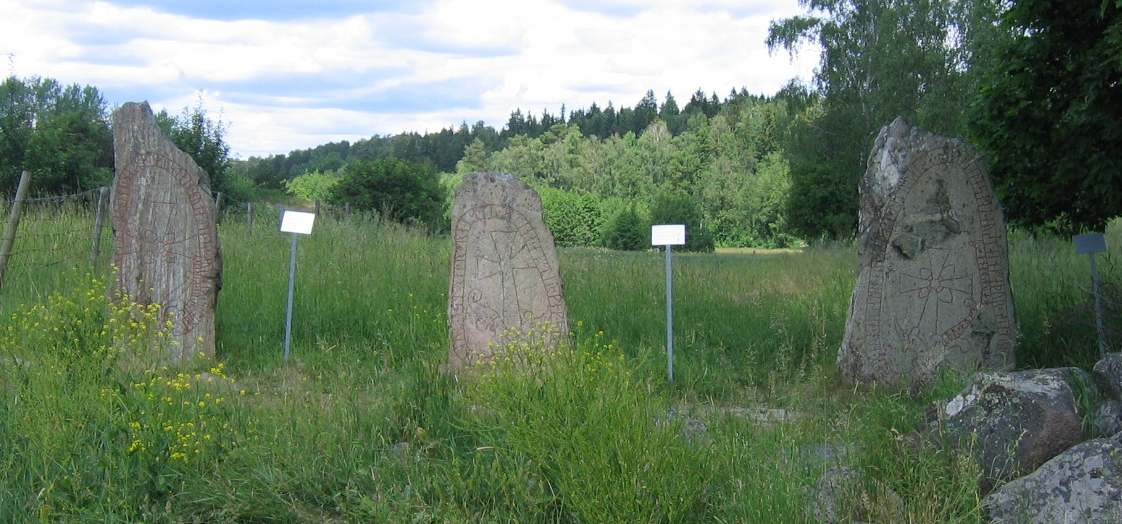
The runestones U 136, U 137 and U 135 have been moved a small distance from their original place so as not to be harmed by pollution and vibrations from cars and trucks.

At Broby bro in Uppland, Sweden there are six runestones. U 139, U 140 and U 151 still stand by the road, but U 135, U 136 and U 137 have been moved a distance away from the road.

The last three stones are in the style Pr2 and thus dated to the period 1020–1050, but the internal relationship between them shows that U 137 is the oldest one. They belong to a group of c. 20 runestones called the Jarlabanke Runestones that are connected to the local strongman Jarlabanke and his clan. Together with the Hargs bro runic inscriptions and the Uppland Rune Inscriptions 101, 143 and 147 these particular runestones, however, centre on the matriarch of the clan called Estrid.

U 137 tells that Estrid and Östen have a son named Gag who dies, and when it was raised Östen was still alive. The other stones (U 135 and U 136) constitute a twin monument telling that Östen has gone to Jerusalem and died in the Byzantine Empire.

Estrid and Östen had three sons: Ingefast, Östen and Sven, who built a bridge and a barrow after their father. These twin stones show that Gag died as relatively young as he is not mentioned on them.

Estrid is the same person as the Estrid who is mentioned on a number of runestones in Täby and other locations (Hargs bro runic inscriptions and Uppland Rune Inscriptions 101, 143 and 147). This Estrid was the maternal ancestor of a great clan called the Jarlabanke clan, and she was the maternal grandmother of the powerful Jarlabanke who claimed to own all of Täby.

The carver of the Snottsta runestone called U 329, where an Estrid and her brother Ragnfast are mentioned, was Fot who also made the runestones for the Jarlabanke clan. This strongly suggests that Estrid was born in Snottsta (also spelled Snåttsta), married Östen of Täby and married for the second time in Harg near Snottsta.

== U 135 ==
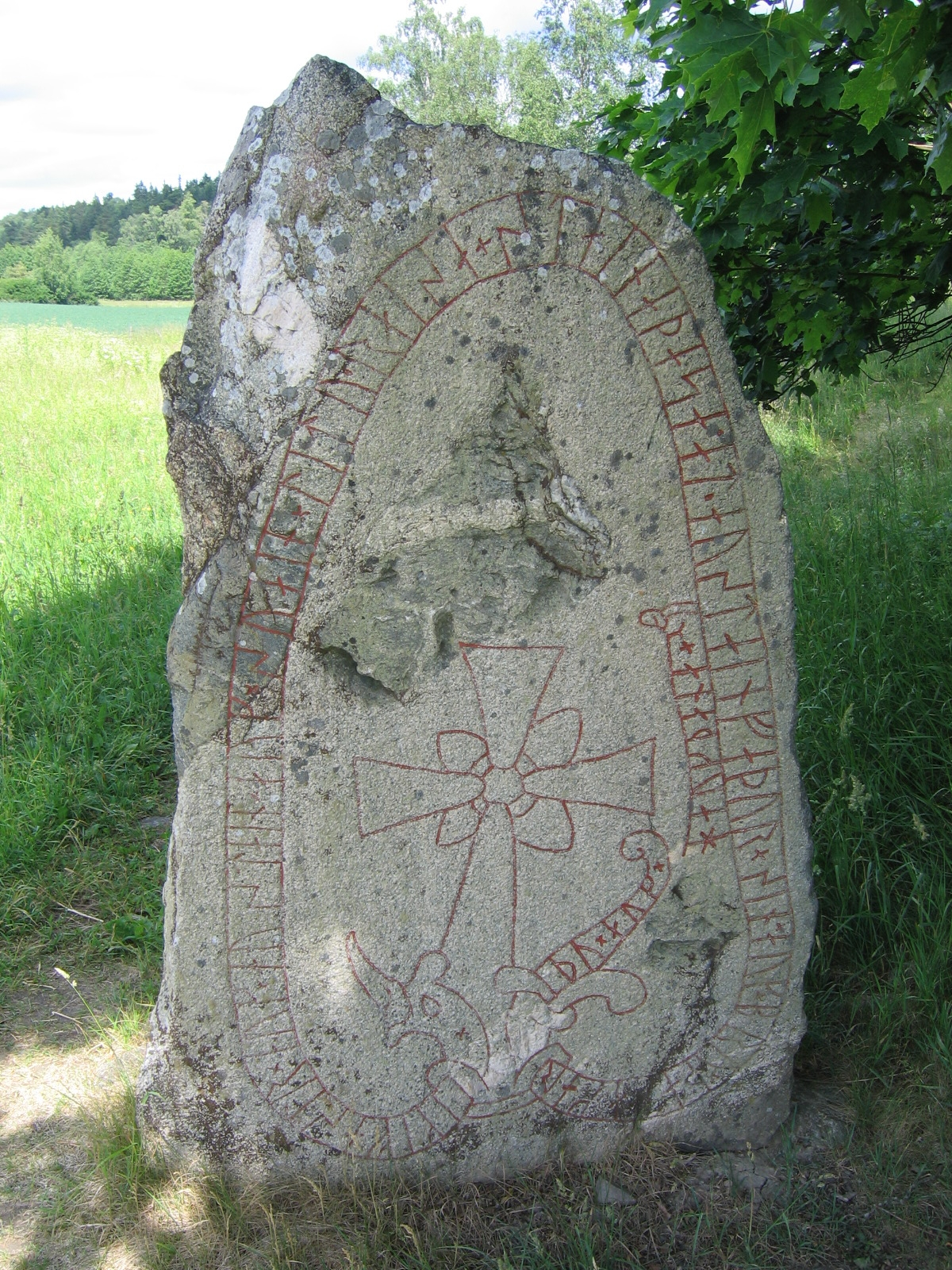
U 135

The first line is Latin transliteration, the second Old Norse transcription:

× ikifastr × auk × austain × auk × suain × litu * raisa + staina þasa * at * austain faþur × sin × auk × bru × þasa karþu × auk × hauk þana ×
{} Ingifastr {} ok {} Øystæinn {} ok {} Svæinn {} letu {} ræisa {} stæina þessa {} at {} Øystæin, faður {} sinn, {} ok {} bro {} þessa gærðu {} ok {} haug þenna. {}
Ingifastr and Eysteinn and Sveinn had these stones raised in memory of Eysteinn, their father, and made this bridge and this mound.

== U 136 ==
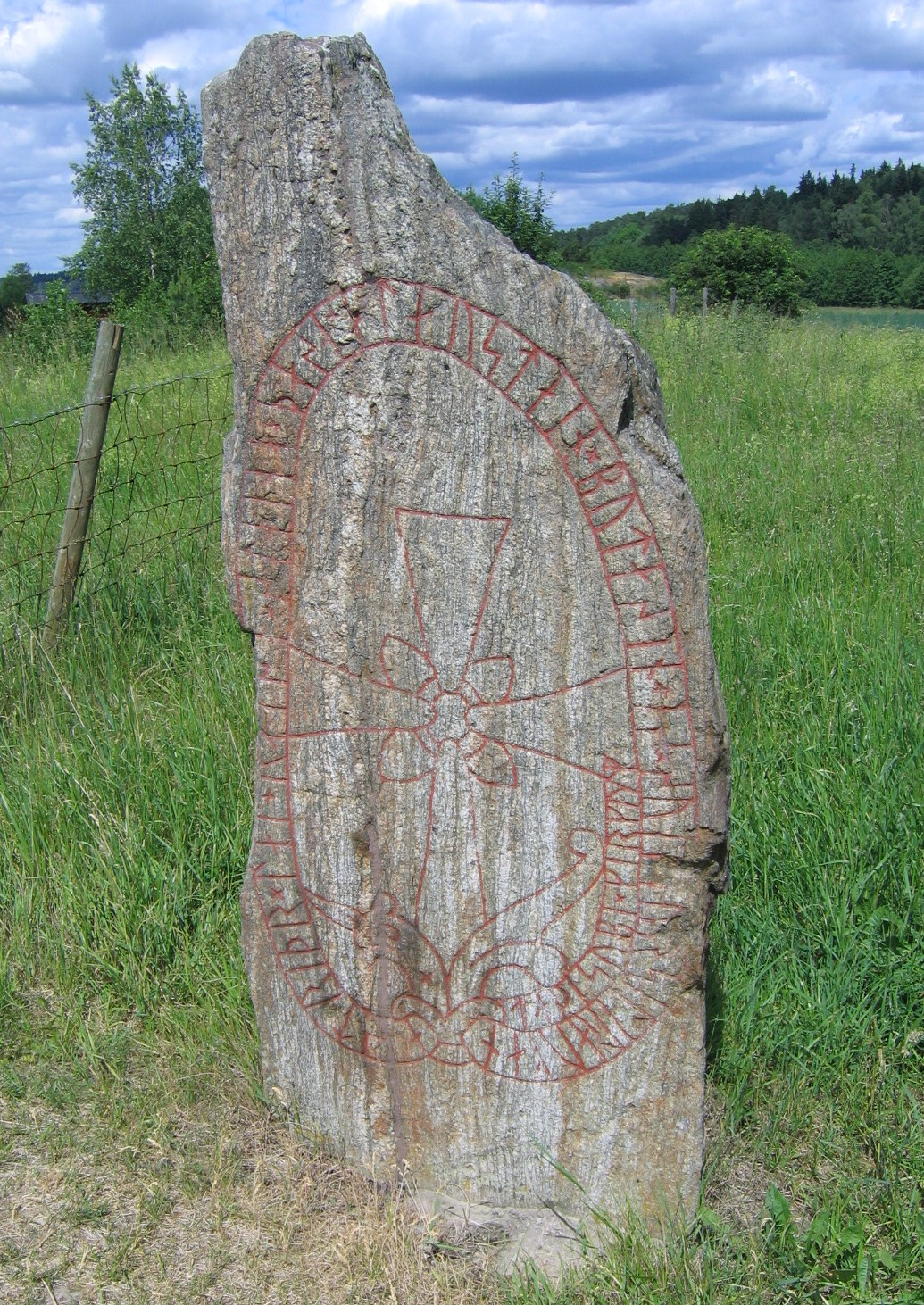
U 136

The first line is Latin transliteration, the second Old Norse transcription:

× astriþr × la(t) + raisa × staina × þasa × [a]t austain × buta sin × is × suti × iursalir auk antaþis ub i × kirkum
{} Æstriðr {} let {} ræisa {} stæina {} þessa {} at Øystæin, {} bonda sinn, {} es {} sotti {} Iorsaliʀ ok ændaðis upp i {} Grikkium.
Ástríðr had these stones raised in memory of Eysteinn, her husbandman, who went to Jerusalem and met his end up in Greece.

== U 137 ==
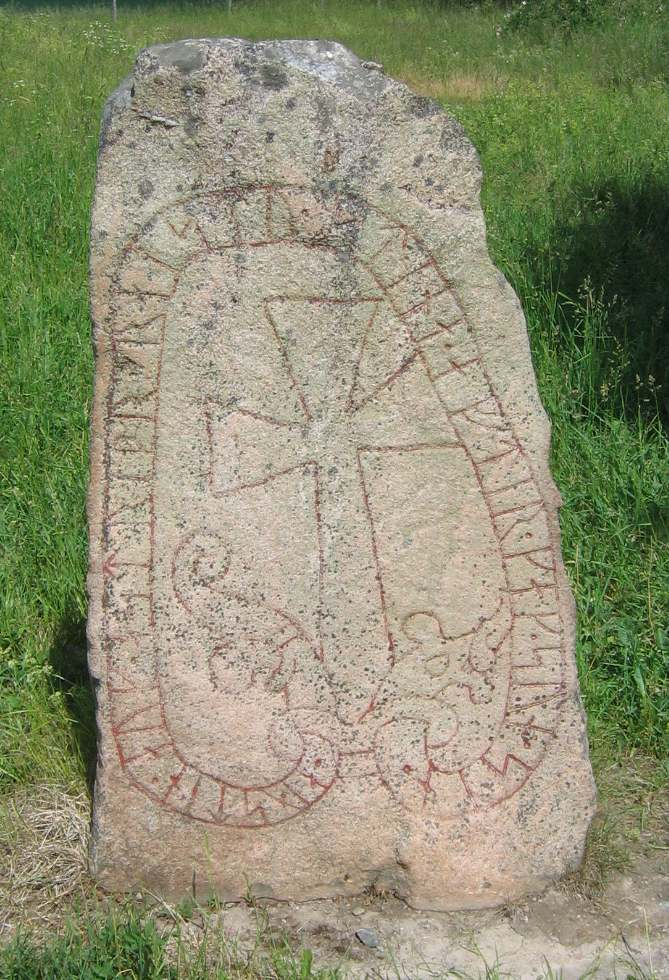
U 137

The first line is Latin transliteration, the second Old Norse transcription:

* aystin * auk * astriþr * raistu * stina * aftir * kak * sun * sin *
{} Øystæinn {} ok {} Æstriðr {} ræistu {} stæina {} æftiʀ {} Kag(?)/Gag(?), {} sun {} sinn. {}
Eysteinn and Ástríðr raised the stones in memory of Kagr(?)/Gagr(?), their son.

== U 139 ==
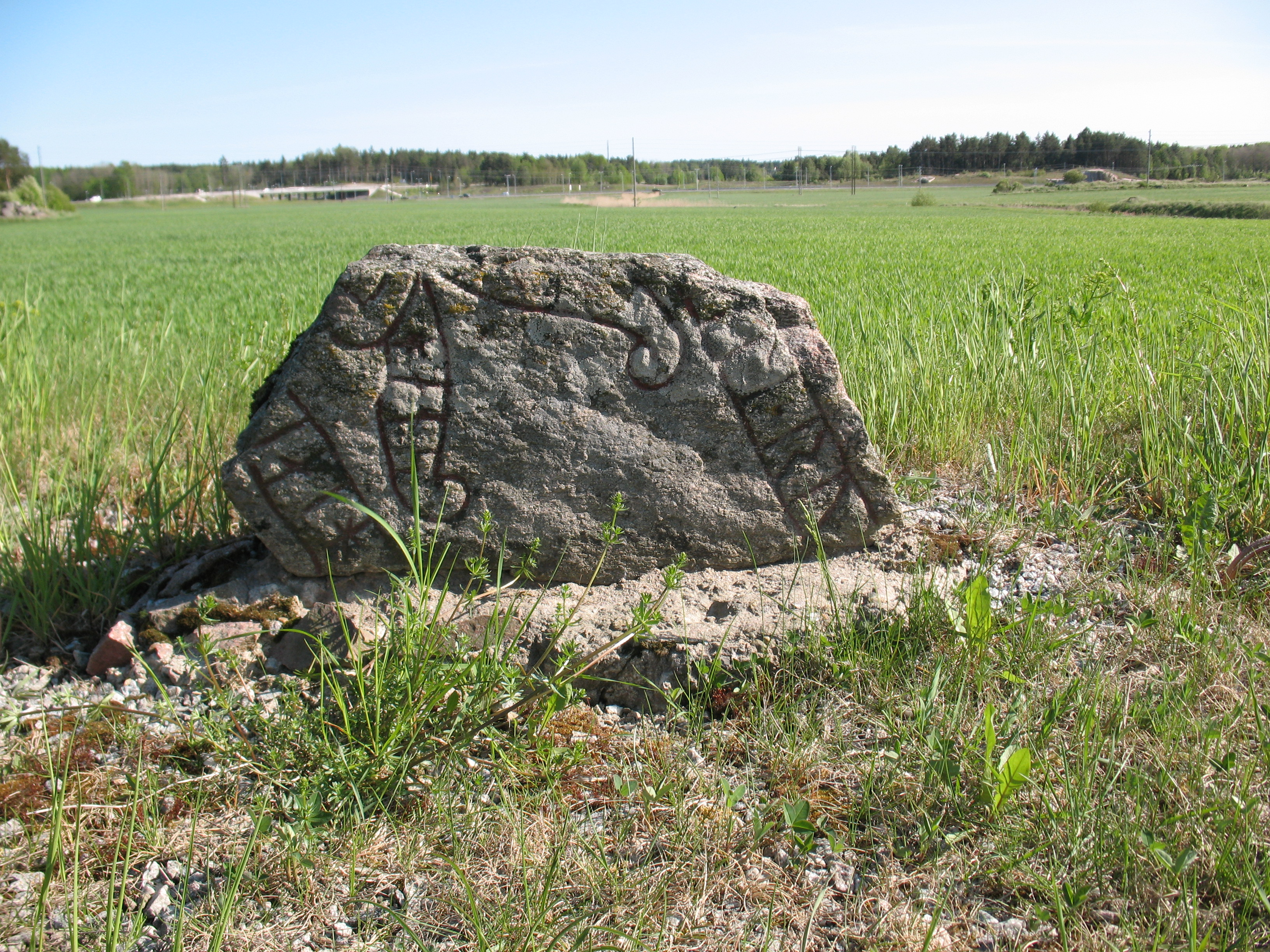
U 139

The first line is Latin transliteration, the second Old Norse transcription:

... ...sti ' ru... {... *} hia(l)... ... hans
... [ri]sti {} ru[naʀ] ... hial[pi] ... hans
... carved the runes ... may help ... his

== U 151 ==
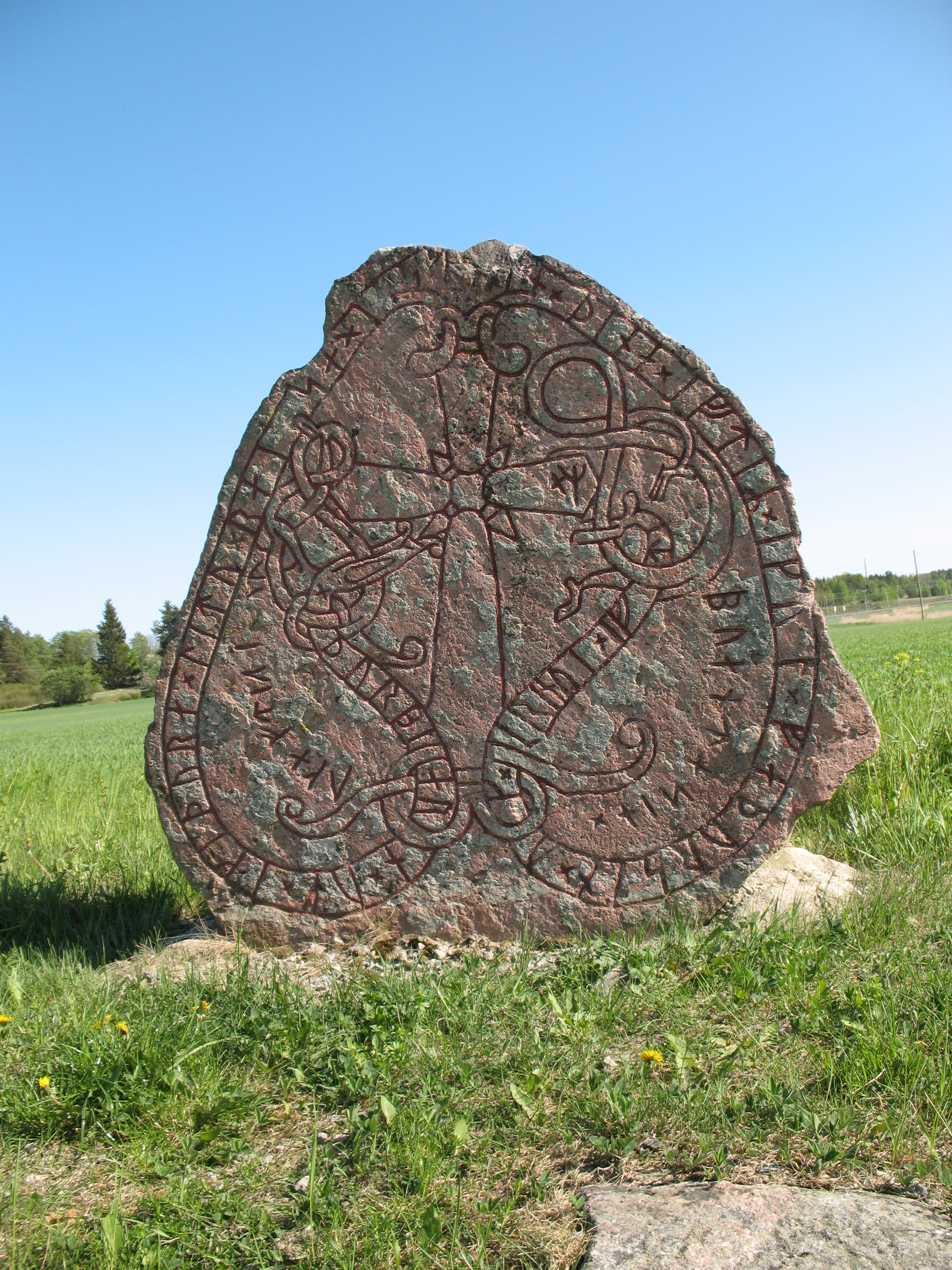
U 151

The first line is Latin transliteration, the second Old Norse transcription:

× þurbiarn × uk × ikiþura × litu × raisa × ist[ai]n × þina × iftiʀ × ikul × faþur sin × uk × irinui × iftiʀ × buanta sin × uk afti(ʀ) ---
{} Þorbiorn {} ok {} Ingiþora {} letu {} ræisa {} stæin {} þenna {} æftiʀ {} Igul, {} faður sinn, {} ok {} Ærinvi {} æftiʀ {} boanda sinn {} ok æftiʀ ...
Þorbjôrn and Ingiþóra had this stone raised in memory of Ígull, their father; and Erinvé in memory of her husbandman and in memory of ...

== See also ==
- List of runestones

== Sources ==
- Rundata
- Inga och Estrid - en såpa för tusen år sedan: Människor, händelser och platser i Ingas och Estrids liv. A page at the Museum of Stockholm County.
