= Uppland Runic Inscription 605 =

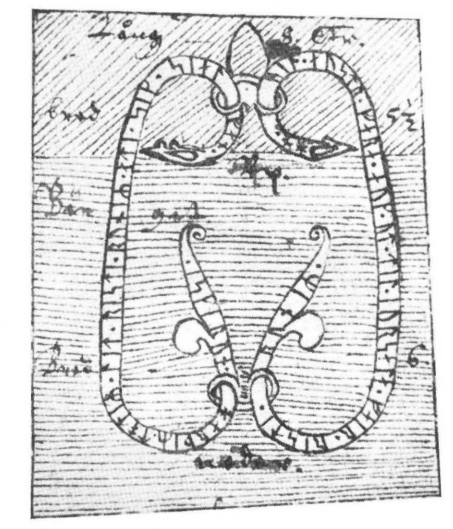
U 605, as depicted by Mårten Aschaneus from Aske (1575-1641). The rock disappeared during the construction of a road in the 17th c. and has never been seen again.

The Uppland Runic Inscription 605 is a lost Viking Age runestone engraved in Old Norse with the Younger Futhark runic alphabet. It was located at Stäket, in Upplands Bro Municipality. The style was possibly Pr3.

== Inscription ==
[· iskirun · harþiʀ · totiʀ · lit · risti · runiʀ · ati · sik · sialfan · hn · uil · austr · fara · auk · ut · til · iursala · fair · risti · runiʀ ·]
{} Ingirun(?), {} Harðaʀ {} dottiʀ, {} let {} rista {} runaʀ {} at {} sik {} sialfa. {} Hon {} vill {} austr {} fara {} ok {} ut {} til {} Iorsala. {} Fotr(?) {} risti {} runaʀ. {}
"Ingirún(?) Harðr's daughter, had the runes carved in memory of herself. She wants to travel to the east and abroad to Jerusalem. Fótr(?) carved the runes."

== See also ==
- List of runestones
