= German submarine U-42 =

U-42 may refer to one of the following German submarines:

- SM U-42 was ordered from Fiat-Laurenti for observation of competitive technologies; never delivered to Germany due to outbreak of war; served in the Royal Italian Navy as Balilla from 1915; sunk in July 1916 off the island of Lissa
  - During the First World War, Germany also had these submarines with similar names:
    - SM UB-42, a Type UB II submarine launched in 1916 and surrendered on 16 November 1918
    - SM UC-42, a Type UC II submarine launched in 1916 and sunk on 10 September 1917
- German submarine U-42 (1939), a Type IX submarine that served in the Second World War until sunk on 13 October 1939
