= Small nucleolar RNA SNORD101 =

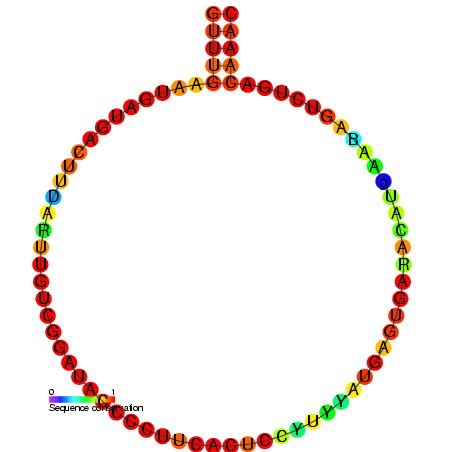
- Predicted secondary structure and sequence conservation of SNORD101

Identifiers
- Symbol: SNORD101
- Alt. Symbols: U101
- Rfam: RF00186

Other data
- RNA type: Gene; snRNA; snoRNA; CD-box
- Domain: Eukaryota
- GO: GO:0006396 GO:0005730
- SO: SO:0000593
- PDB structures: PDBe

In molecular biology, snoRNA U101 (also known as SNORD101) is a non-coding RNA (ncRNA) molecule which functions in the modification of other small nuclear RNAs (snRNAs). This type of modifying RNA is usually located in the nucleolus of the eukaryotic cell which is a major site of snRNA biogenesis. It is known as a small nucleolar RNA (snoRNA) and also often referred to as a guide RNA.

snoRNA U101 belongs to the C/D box class of snoRNAs which contain the conserved sequence motifs known as the C box (UGAUGA) and the D box (CUGA). Most of the members of the box C/D family function in directing site-specific 2'-O-methylation of substrate RNAs.

U101 was identified by computational screening of the introns of ribosomal protein genes for conserved C/D box sequence motifs and expression experimentally verified by northern blotting. snoRNA U101 resides in intron 3 of the ribosomal protein S12. U101 shares the same host gene with C/D box snoRNA HBII-429, and the H/ACA box snoRNA ACA33.

There is currently no predicted methylation target for U101.
