= Small nucleolar RNA SNORD42 =

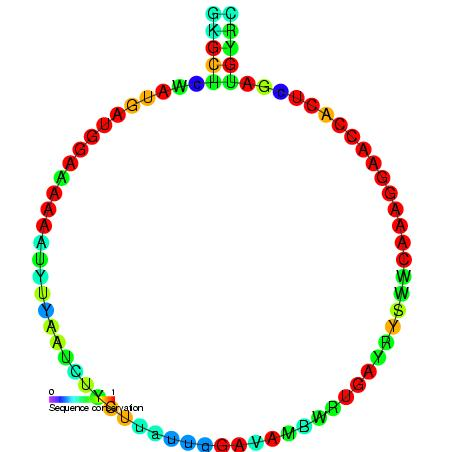
- Predicted secondary structure and sequence conservation of SNORD42

Identifiers
- Symbol: SNORD42
- Alt. Symbols: U42
- Rfam: RF00150

Other data
- RNA type: Gene; snRNA; snoRNA; CD-box
- Domain: Eukaryota
- GO: GO:0006396 GO:0005730
- SO: SO:0000593
- PDB structures: PDBe

In molecular biology, snoRNA U42 (also known as SNORD42) is a non-coding RNA (ncRNA) molecule which functions in the modification of other small nuclear RNAs (snRNAs). This type of modifying RNA is usually located in the nucleolus of the eukaryotic cell which is a major site of snRNA biogenesis. It is known as a small nucleolar RNA (snoRNA) and also often referred to as a guide RNA.

snoRNA U42 belongs to the C/D box class of snoRNAs which contain the conserved sequence motifs known as the C box (UGAUGA) and the D box (CUGA). Most of the members of the box C/D family function in directing site-specific 2'-O-methylation of substrate RNAs.

In the human genome there are two closely related copies of U42 (called U42A and U42B) both located within the introns of the ribosomal protein L23a (RPL23a) gene. Both snoRNAs are predicted to guide the site specific 2'O-ribose methylation of 18S ribosomal RNA (rRNA) residue U116. The mouse orthologue (MBII-287) has also been identified.
