= Fot =

11th century runemaster

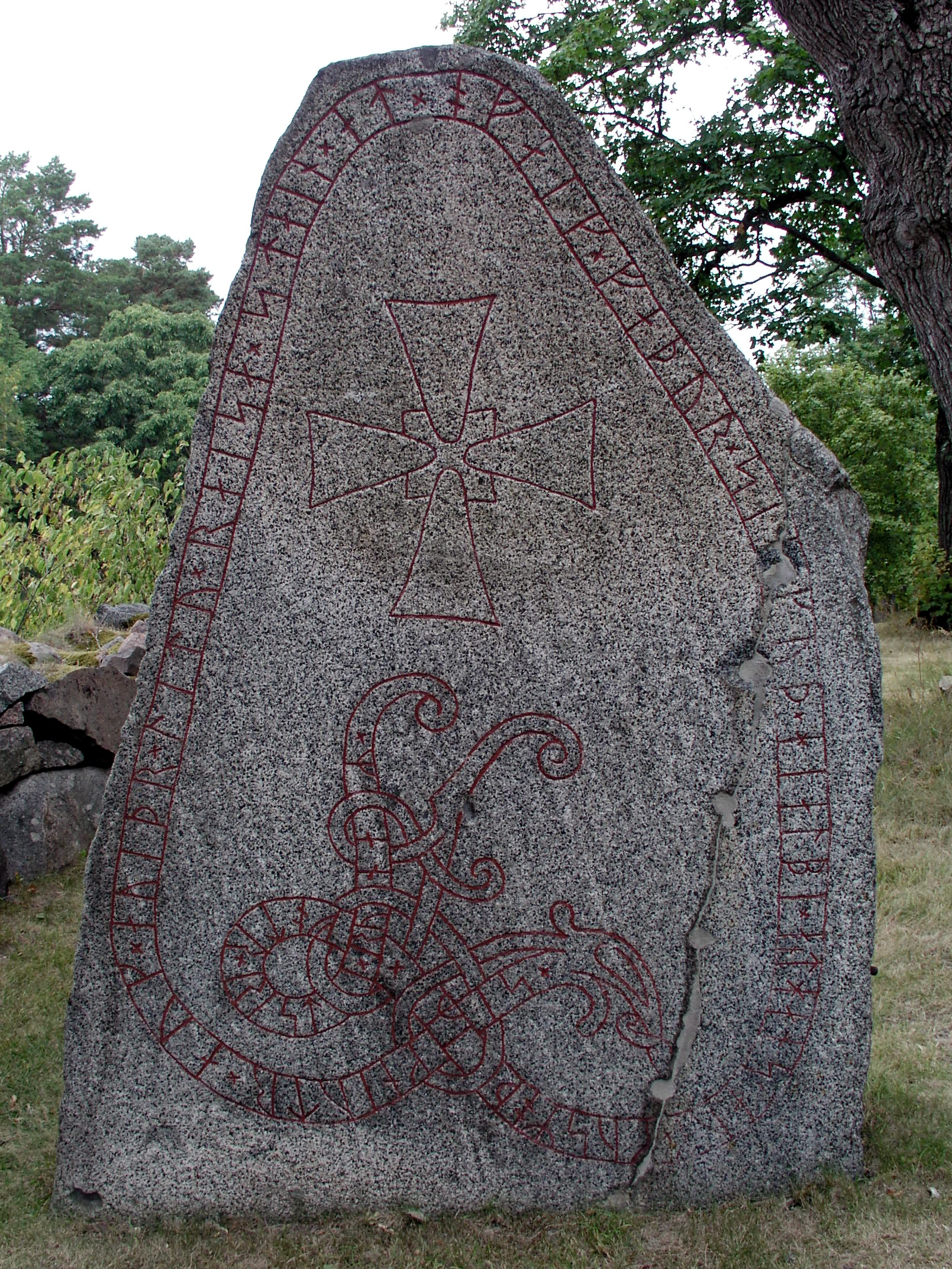
U 945 at Danmark is signed by Fot.

Fot (Old Norse: Fotr) was a runemaster who flourished in mid-11th century Sweden.

== Career ==
Most early medieval Scandinavians were probably literate in runes, and most people probably carved messages on pieces of bone and wood. However, it was more difficult to carve runestones, as it required one to be a stonemason. During the 11th century, when most runestones were raised, there were a few professional runemasters. When rune carvers were finished with an inscription, they would usually carve a signature at the end.

Fot was active as a runemaster in southern Uppland during the late Viking Age. His work is representative of the runestone style known as the Urnes style. This runestone style is characterized by slim and stylized animals that are interwoven into tight patterns. The animal heads are typically seen in profile with slender almond-shaped eyes and upwardly curled appendages on the noses and the necks.

Fot is prominent among the known runemasters as the leading representative of the classic Uppland or Urnes runestone style, and has been called the most artistic of the runemasters of that time. A salient trait is the care with which he chose the stones, how he treated the surface of them, the harmonious ornamentation and the evenly chiseled and firmly designed runes. He is also noted for the consistency of his use of the punctuation mark × between the words in his runic inscriptions. Only a few runestones were signed by Fot. Rundata lists the following inscriptions in Uppland as having Fot's signature: U 167 in Östra Ryd, U 177 in Stav, U 268 in Harby, U 464 in Edeby, U 605 in Stäket, U 638 in Mansängen, U 678 in Skokloster, and U 945 in Danmark. An additional 40 runestones can be attributed to him based upon stylistic analysis.

The runestone U 678 at the church of Skokloster belongs to his most famous works.

One runestone from Södermanland, the now-lost Sö 341 in Stavsta, was apparently signed by a different runemaster with the same name.

== Torgöt Fotsarve ==
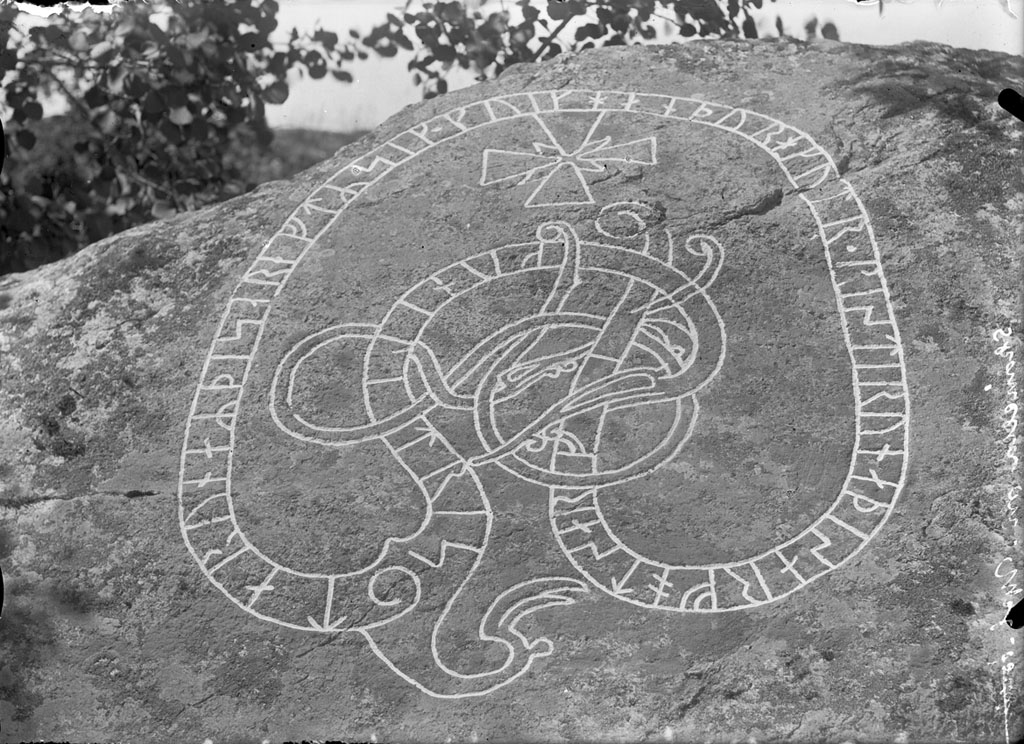
Inscription U 308 in Ekeby is signed by Torgöt.

Runestone U 308 in Ekeby was apparently carved by a son of Fot named Þorgautr, often normalized as Torgöt Fotsarve. The influence of Fot's style is apparent in the son's work as this inscription has been classified as being carved in runestone style Pr4, or Urnes style. The runic inscription on this stone states that "Þorgautr risti runaʀ þessaʀ, Fots arfi", meaning "Þorgautr, Fótr's heir, carved these runes." Other inscriptions signed by Torgöt Fotsarve include U 746 in Hårby and U 958 in Villinge. An additional 18 inscriptions are listed by Rundata as being attributed to him based on stylistic analysis.

== Gallery ==
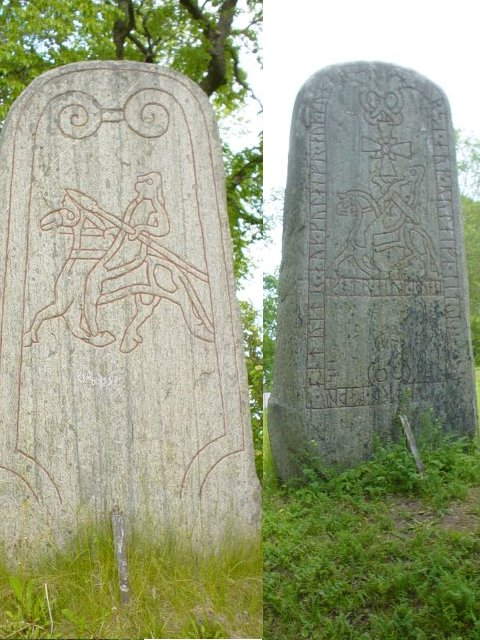
Runestone U 678 is one of his most famous works.

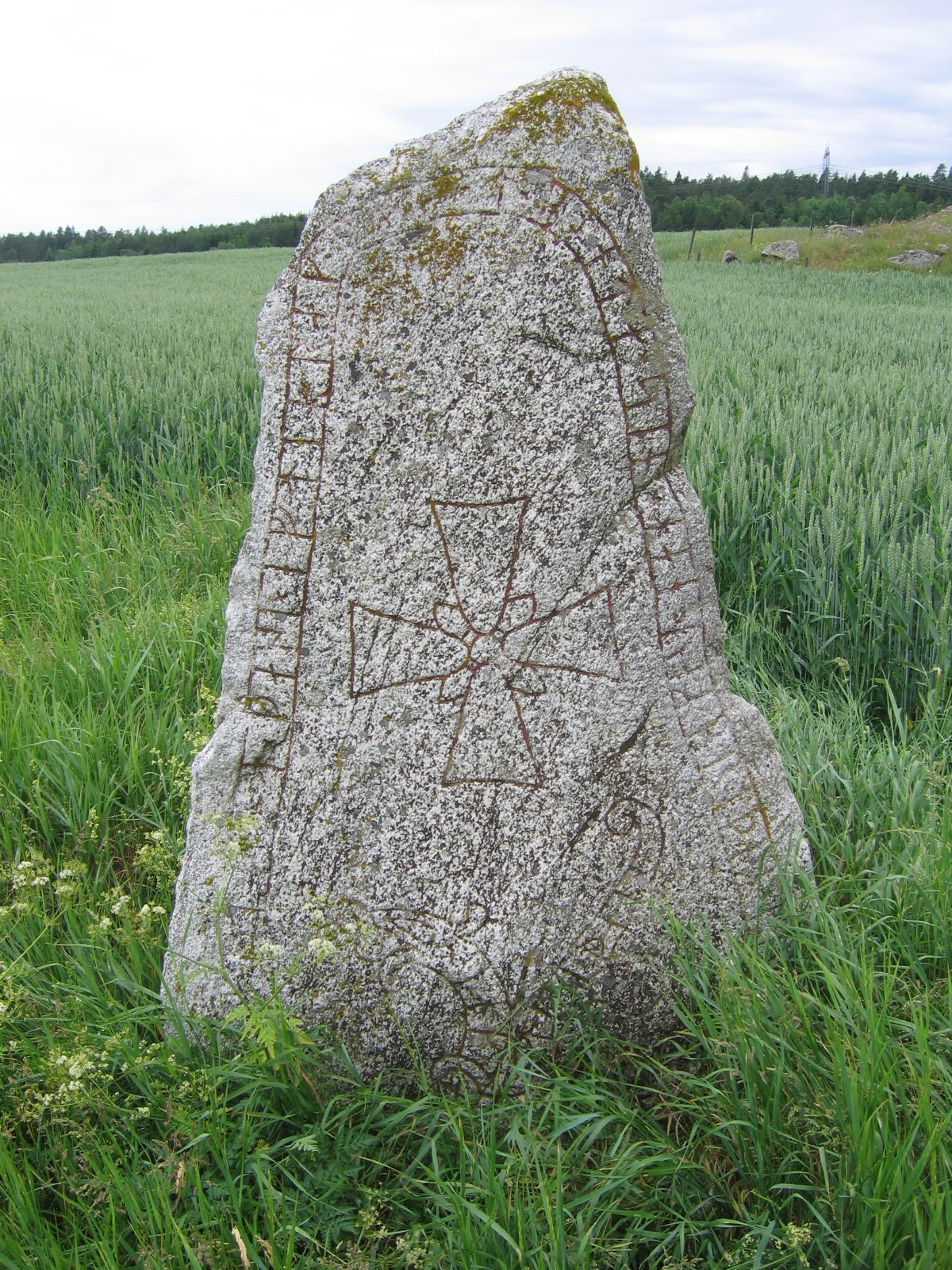
This stone is one of the Snottsta and Vreta stones.

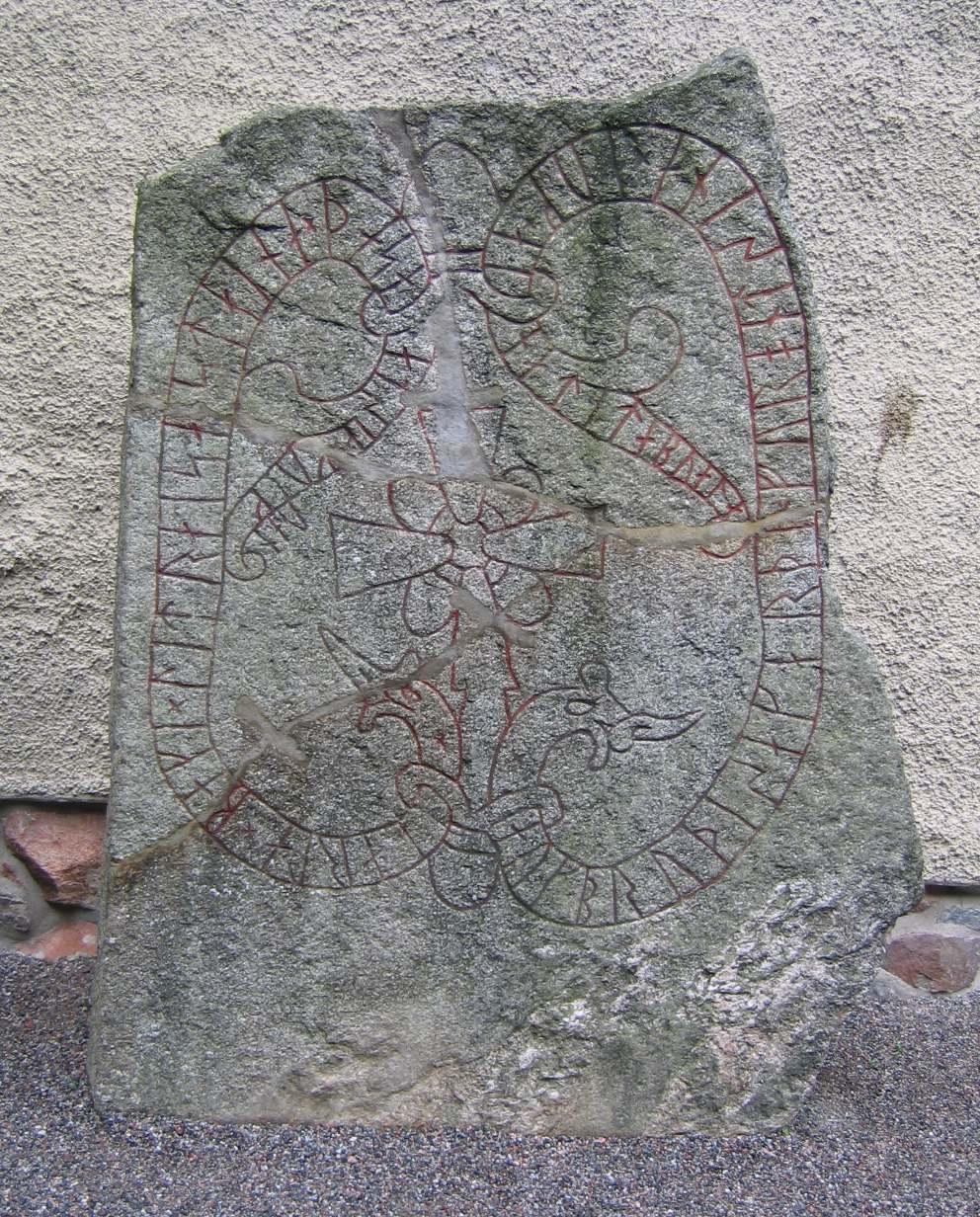
This stone is one of the Jarlabanke Runestones.

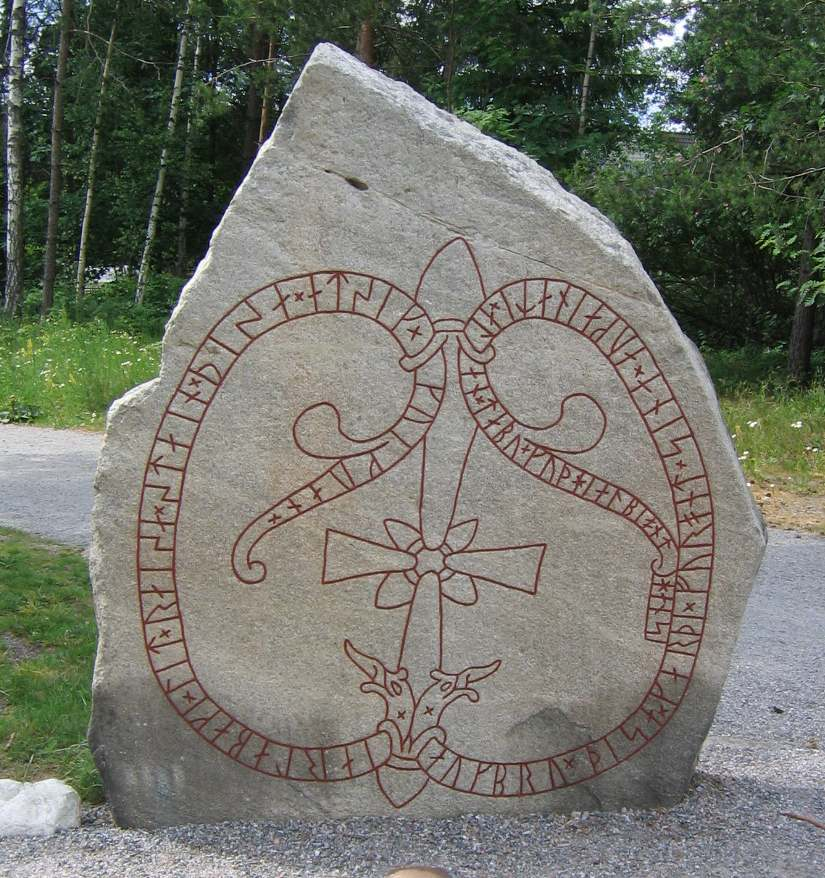
This stone is one of the Jarlabanke Runestones.

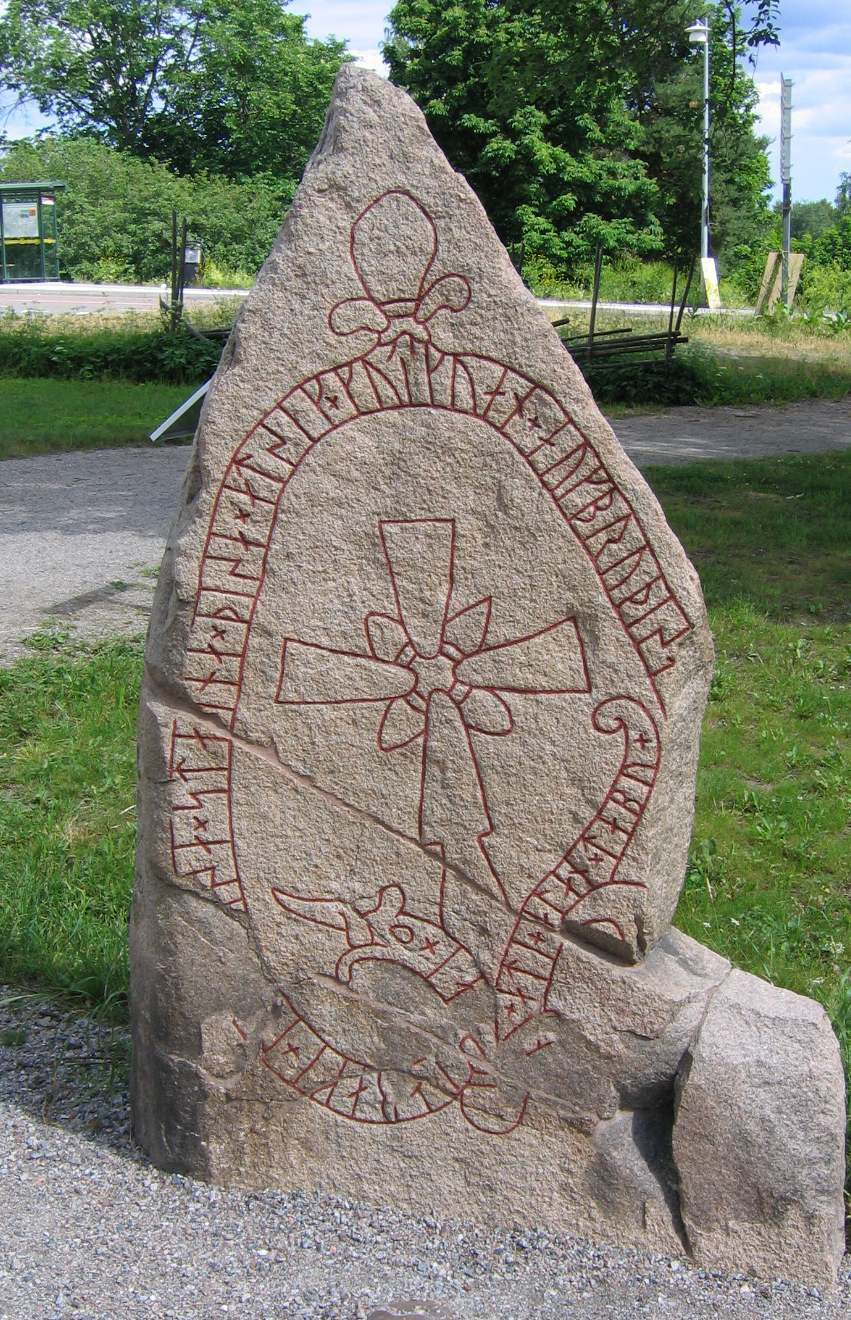
This stone is one of the Jarlabanke Runestones.

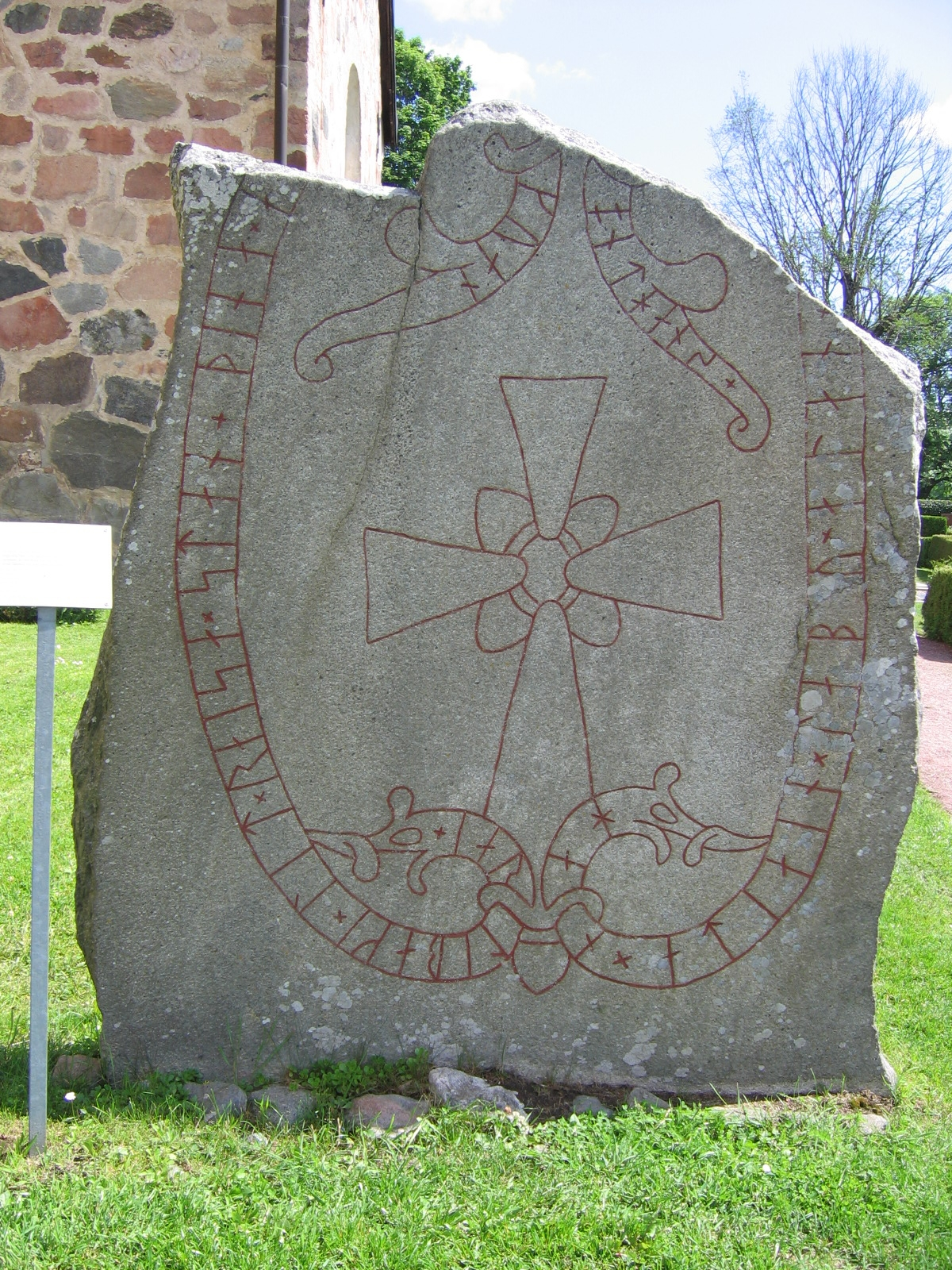
This stone is one of the Jarlabanke Runestones.

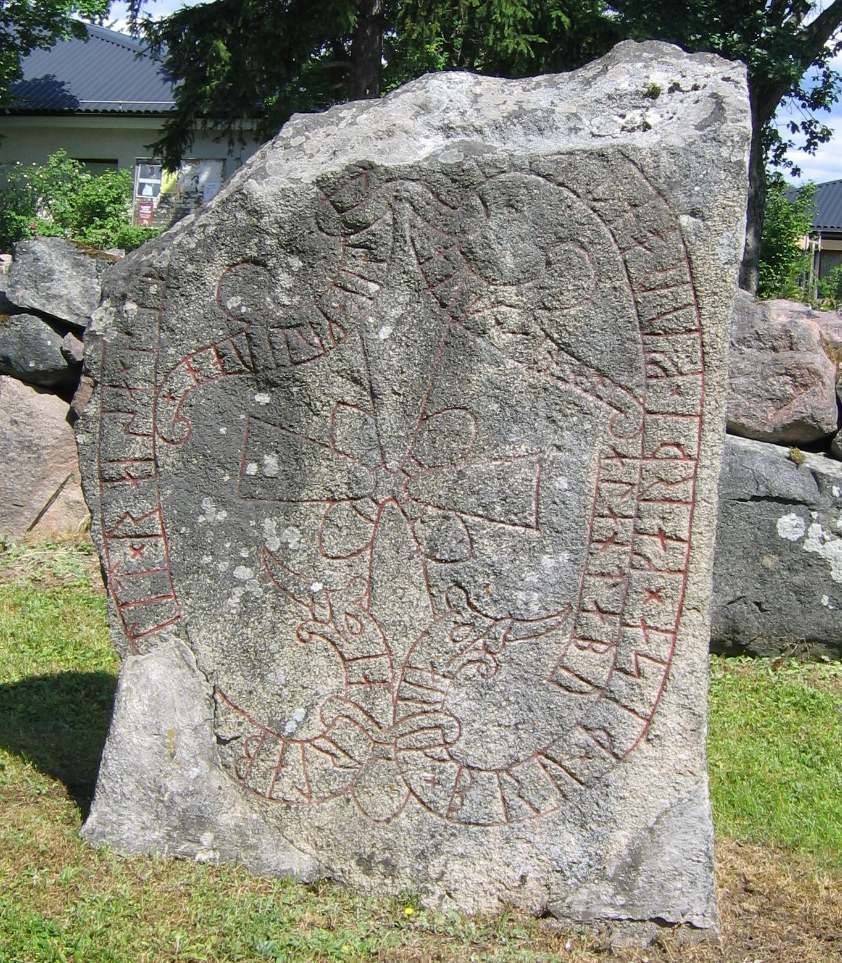
This stone is one of the Jarlabanke Runestones.
