= Uppland Runic Inscription 1011 =

11th-century Swedish runestone

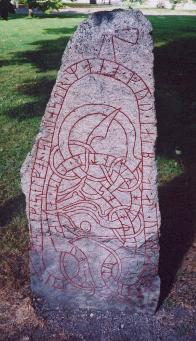
- Created: eleventh century
- Discovered: Uppsala, Uppland, Sweden
- Rundata ID: U 1011
- Runemaster: Vigmund

This runestone, listed in Rundata as runic inscription U 1011, was carved in the 11th century and was originally located at Örby, Rasbo, Sweden.

== Description ==
This runestone consists of a runic inscription on two sides with the text within a serpent and a cross at the top. The runestone was moved from Rasbo to Uppsala in the 17th century. In 1867 this runestone, along with U 489 and U 896, was exhibited in the Exposition Universelle in Paris. It was dropped in Le Havre during its return. After having lain there for several decades, it was returned to Uppsala. It now stands in the Universitetsparken (the University Park) close to the main building of Uppsala University.

This is an unusual runestone in that its sponsor, Vigmund, raised it in honor of himself. There are over twenty other runestones where the sponsor stated that the stone was raised in memory of himself, including Sö 55 in Bjudby, U 127 in Danderyds, the now-lost U 149 in Hagby, U 164 and U 165 in Täby, U 171 in Söderby, U 194 in Väsby, U 212 in Vallentuna, U 261 in Fresta, U 308 in Ekeby, the now-lost U 345 in Yttergärde, U 433 in Husby-Ärlinghundra, U 734 in Linsunda, U 739 in Gådi, U 803 in Långtora, U 962 in Vaksala, U 1040 in Fasma, the now-lost U 1114 in Myrby, U 1181 in Lilla Runhällen, U Fv1958;250 in Sigtuna, Vs 17 in Råby, Vs 32 in Prästgården, and DR 212 in Tillitse. Of these, five stones known as the Jarlabanke Runestones were sponsored by the same person in memory of himself.

The inscription is carved in runestone style Pr4, which is also known as Urnes style. This runestone style is characterized by slim and stylized animals that are interwoven into tight patterns. The animal heads are typically seen in profile with slender almond-shaped eyes and upwardly curled appendages on the noses and the necks.

Similar the inscription on U 1016, this runic inscription uses the term stýrimanns or stýrimaðr as a title that is translated as "captain." Other runestones use this term apparently to describe working as a steersman on a ship. Other inscriptions using this title include Sö 161 in Råby, U 1016 in Fjuckby, U Fv1976;104 at the Uppsala Cathedral, and DR 1 in Hedeby. The Norse word sál for soul in the prayer was imported from English and was first recorded as being used during the tenth century.

== Runic inscription ==
uihmuntr ' lit ' agua · stain · at ' sig ' selfon ' slyiastr ' mono ' guþ ' ia[l]bi (s)ial ' uihmuntar · styrimons
Vígmundr {} lét {} hǫggva {} stein {} at {} sik {} sjalfan, {} slœgjastr {} manna. {} Guð {} hjalpi sál {} Vígmundar {} stýrimanns.
Vígmundr had the stone cut in memory of himself, the most skillful of men. May God help Vígmundr the captain's soul.

uihmuntr · auk ' afiriþ : eku merki ' at kuikuan · sik ·
Vígmundr {} ok {} Áfríðr {} hjoggu merki {} at kvikvan {} sik. {}
Vígmundr and Áfríðr cut the landmark in memory of themselves while alive.

== Photographs ==
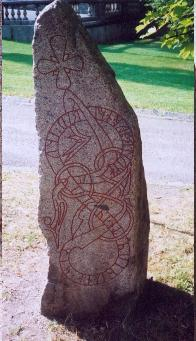
U 1011, second side.

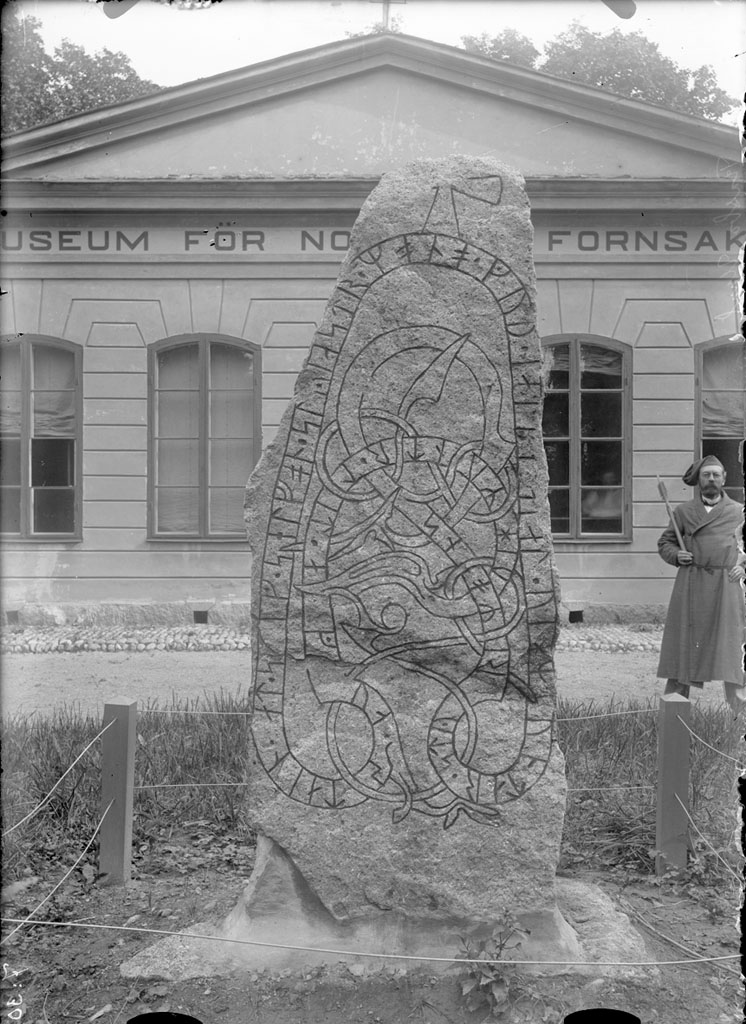
Photograph of U 1011 in about 1900.

== See also ==
- List of runestones
- Runic alphabet
- Runestone
