= Läby Church =

Church in Uppsala Municipality, Sweden

Coordinates: 59°50′54″N 17°31′23″E

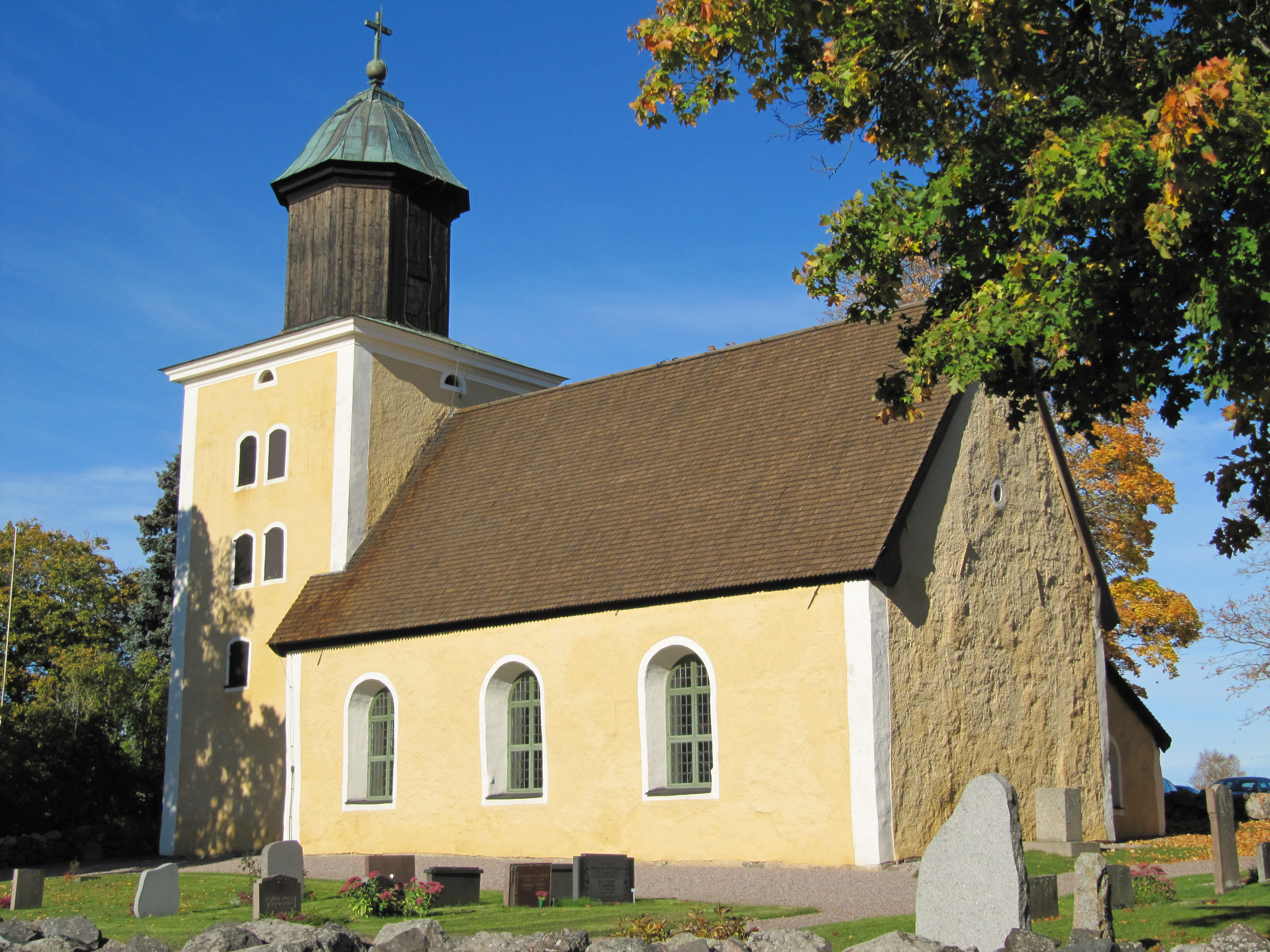
Läby Church, external view

Läby Church (Swedish: Läby kyrka) is a Lutheran church in the Archdiocese of Uppsala in Uppsala County, Sweden. It is located on the main road between Uppsala and Sala, and is the rural church closest to Uppsala city.

== History and architecture ==
Although Läby Church certainly dates from the Middle Ages, its history is not known in any detail. Its origins may have been a Romanesque church, and according to some sources the oldest part of the church are from the 13th century. The church has furthermore been partially reconstructed and expanded at later times, but as to the question of what was built when there seems to be no consensus. The tower roof lantern at least seems to have been built at the beginning of the 19th century.

In 1890 the parish was merged with neighbouring Vänge parish, and the congregation moved to Vänge Church. Läby Church was abandoned and left in ruin. In the 1920s however the congregation decided to move back to its old church, and reconstruction works in the National Romantic style were begun under the leadership of architect Birger Jonzon. Archbishop Nathan Söderblom was involved in bringing the old church back to life. The restored church was opened again in 1928. Furnishings which had been removed were returned and the church received a new decorated ceiling.

The church is one of the smallest in the diocese. It is a simple hall church with a medieval nave and sacristy. The construction material is fieldstone, and the roof is made of shake. Internally, the church is characterised by the undecorated walls, the flat ceiling and the curious pulpit, built in 1753 on top of a medieval altar and constructed by carpenter Magnus Granlund. The latter reflects a pietist tradition within Lutheranism that places the oral sermon in the centre of the life of the church. A triumphal cross from the 12th century originally from Läby Church is currently on display at the Swedish History Museum.
