= Uppland Runic Inscription 171 =

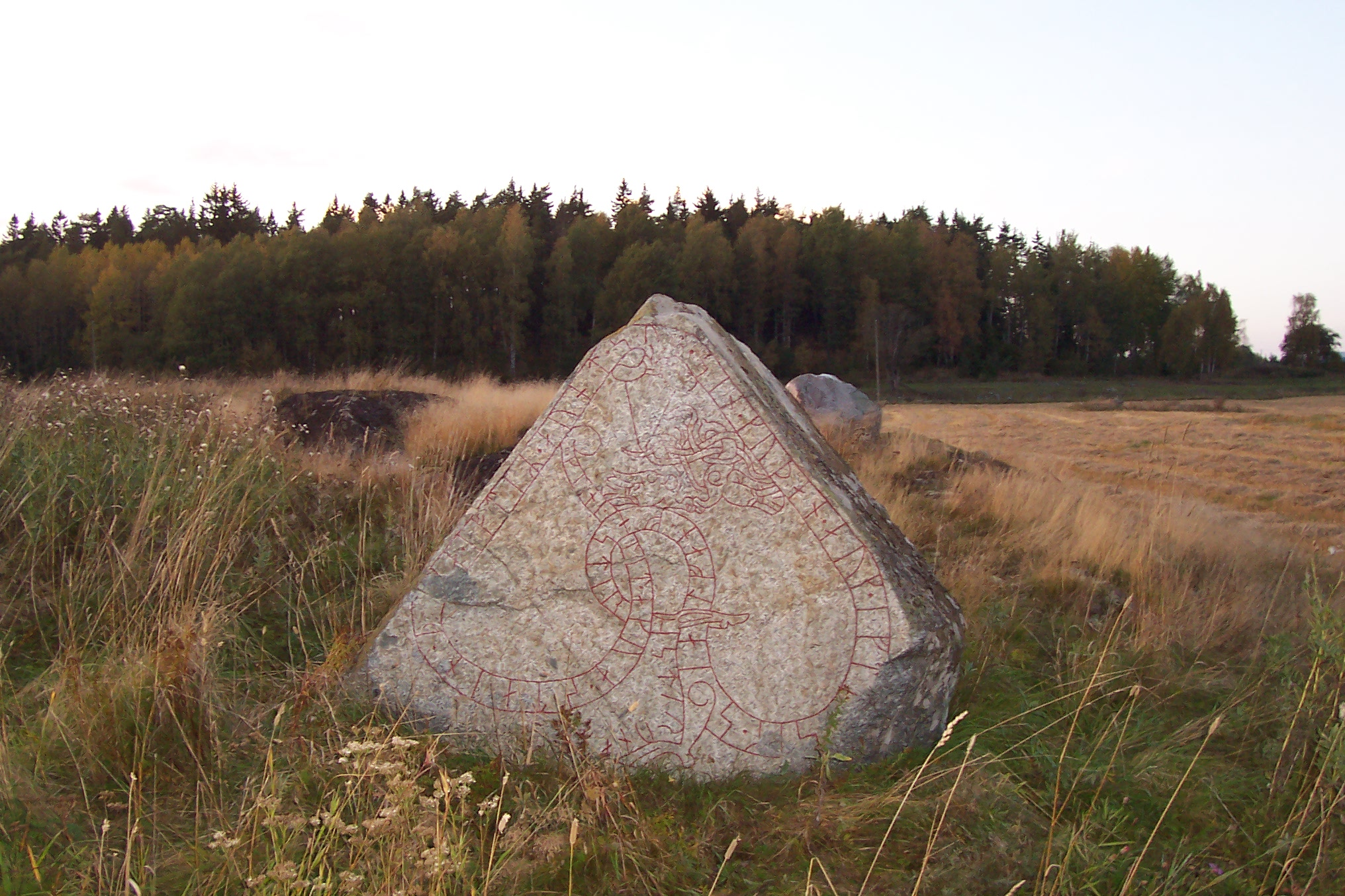
U 171 in Söderby.

Uppland Runic Inscription 171 or U 171 is the Rundata catalog listing for a Viking Age memorial runestone that is located in Söderby, which is four kilometers west of Vaxholm, Stockholm County, Sweden, and in the historic province of Uppland.

== Description ==
The inscription on U 171 consists of runic text in the younger futhark that is carved on a serpent that follows the edge of the triangular-shaped granite stone. The inscription is classified as being carved in runestone style Pr4, which is also known as Urnes style. This runestone style is characterized by slim and stylized animals that are interwoven into tight patterns. The animal heads are typically seen in profile with slender almond-shaped eyes and upwardly curled appendages on the noses and the necks. The inscription was carved by a runemaster who used the signature Fasti, with the runes for his signature line fasti risti runaʀ or "Fasti carved the runes" located outside of the serpent near its leg. Based on stylistic analysis, this runemaster is believed to have also created the nearby but now-lost runestone U 170 in Bogesund, where the runemaster's signature was recorded as being Fastulfr. As such, Fasti may be a nickname. On U 171, the runemaster used a word divider punctuation mark consisting of a single dot between each word that was carved on the serpent.

The runic text states that the stone was raised by a man named Gunni in memory of his son Eyndr and in memory of himself. It is believed that this stone is associated with three other nearby runestones that were raised by the same family, the others being U 166 and 167 in Östra Ryds and U 170 in Bogesund. There are over twenty other runestones where the sponsor of the stone stated that the stone was raised in memory of himself, including Sö 55 in Bjudby, U 127 in Danderyds, the now-lost U 149 in Hagby, U 164 and U 165 in Täby, U 194 in Väsby, U 212 in Vallentuna, U 261 in Fresta, U 308 in Ekeby, the now-lost U 345 in Yttergärde, U 433 in Husby-Ärlinghundra, U 734 in Linsunda, U 739 in Gådi, U 803 in Långtora, U 962 in Vaksala, U 1011 in Örby, U 1040 in Fasma, the now-lost U 1114 in Myrby, U 1181 in Lilla Runhällen, U Fv1958;250 in Sigtuna, Vs 17 in Råby, Vs 32 in Prästgården, and DR 212 in Tillitse. Of these, five stones known as the Jarlabanke Runestones were sponsored by the same person in memory of himself.

== Inscription ==
=== Transliteration of the runes into Latin characters ===
kuni * lit * akua * stain * þi-a * iftiʀ * aunt * sun * sin * kuþan * auk * if(t)(i)- * s(i)(k) * sialfan * fasti risti runaʀ

=== Transcription into Old Norse ===
Gunni let haggva stæin þe[nn]a æftiʀ Øynd, sun sinn goðan, ok æfti[ʀ] sik sialfan. Fasti risti runaʀ.

=== Translation in English ===
Gunni had this stone cut in memory of Eyndr, his good son, and in memory of himself. Fasti carved the runes.

== See also ==
- List of runestones
