= Uppland Runic Inscription 308 =

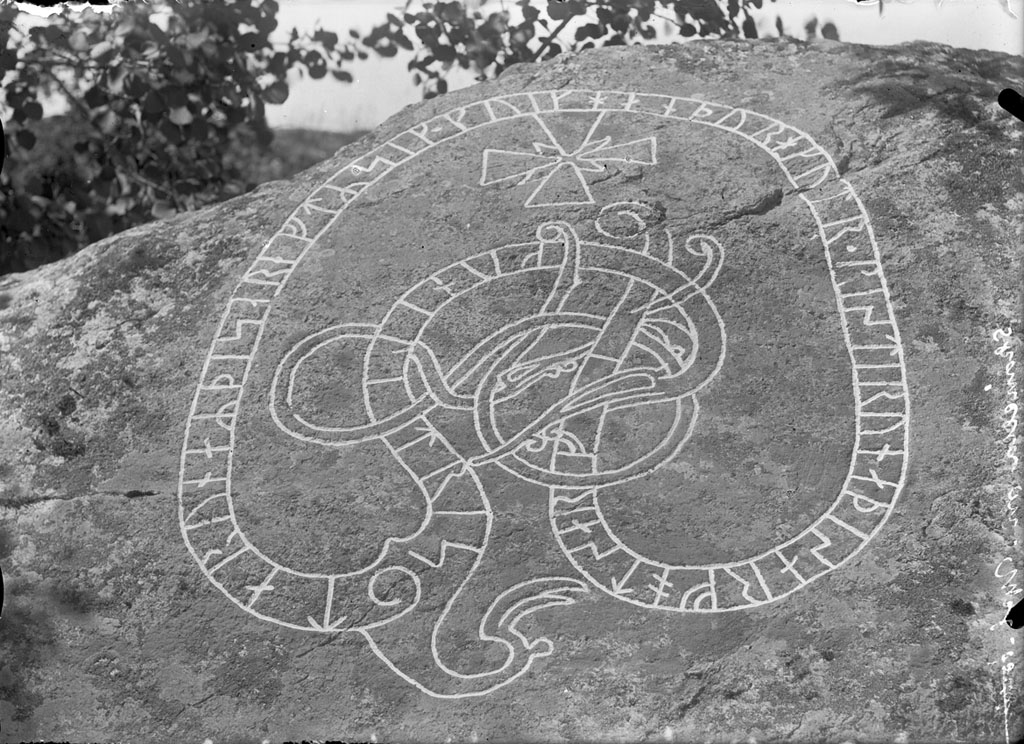
Runestone U 308 is located in Ekeby, Uppland, Sweden.

Uppland Runic Inscription 308 or U 308 is the Rundata catalog designation for a memorial runestone that is located in Ekeby, Stockholm County, Sweden, which was in the historic province of Uppland. While the tradition of carving inscriptions into boulders began in the 4th century and lasted into the 12th century, most runestones date from the late Viking Age.

== Description ==
This inscription is carved on a rock that is north-west of Skånela Church and consists of a Christian cross surrounded by a runic text within a serpent band. The inscription is about 1.2 meters tall by 1 meters wide. The runic text indicates that it was carved by Þorgautr, which is often normalized as Torgöt, and states that he is the son of the runemaster Fot, who was an active runemaster in southern Uppland during the late Viking Age. Two other surviving runestones listed in the Rundata catalog, U 746 in Hårby and U 958 in Villinge, are listed as being signed by Þorgautr, and several others are attributed either to him based on stylistic analysis. This runestone is considered to be similar in style to those carved by Þorgautr's father, Fot, and is classified as being carved in runestone style Pr4, which is also known as the Urnes style. This runestone style is characterized by slim and stylized animals that are interwoven into tight patterns. The animal heads are typically seen in profile with slender almond-shaped eyes and upwardly curled appendages on the noses and the necks.

The runic text states that that stone was raised by a man named Gunni in memory of himself. There are over twenty other runestones in which the sponsor states that the stone was raised in memory of himself, including Sö 55 in Bjudby, U 127 in Danderyds, the now-lost U 149 in Hagby, U 164 and U 165 in Täby, U 171 in Söderby, U 194 in Väsby, U 212 in Vallentuna, U 261 in Fresta, the now-lost U 345 in Yttergärde, U 433 in Husby-Ärlinghundra, U 734 in Linsunda, U 739 in Gådi, U 803 in Långtora, U 962 in Vaksala, U 1011 in Örby, U 1040 in Fasma, the now-lost U 1114 in Myrby, U 1181 in Lilla Runhällen, U Fv1958;250 in Sigtuna, Vs 17 in Råby, Vs 32 in Prästgården, and DR 212 in Tillitse. Of these, five stones known as the Jarlabanke Runestones were sponsored by the same person in memory of himself. The name Þorgautr contains the Norse pagan god Thor as a theophoric name element and means "Thor-Goth."

== Inscription ==
=== Transliteration of the runes into Latin characters ===
kuni lit rista runaʀ þisar eftʀ sik * kuikhan þurhkutr * risti runa þisar fots arfi

=== Transcription into Old Norse ===
Gunni lét rista rúnar þessar eptir sik kvikvan. Þorgautr risti rúnar þessar, Fóts arfi.

=== Translation in English ===
Gunni had these runes carved in memory of himself while alive. Þorgautr, Fótr's heir, carved these runes.

== See also ==
- List of runestones
