= Uppland Runic Inscription 905 =

Coordinates: 59°51′22″N 17°26′05″E

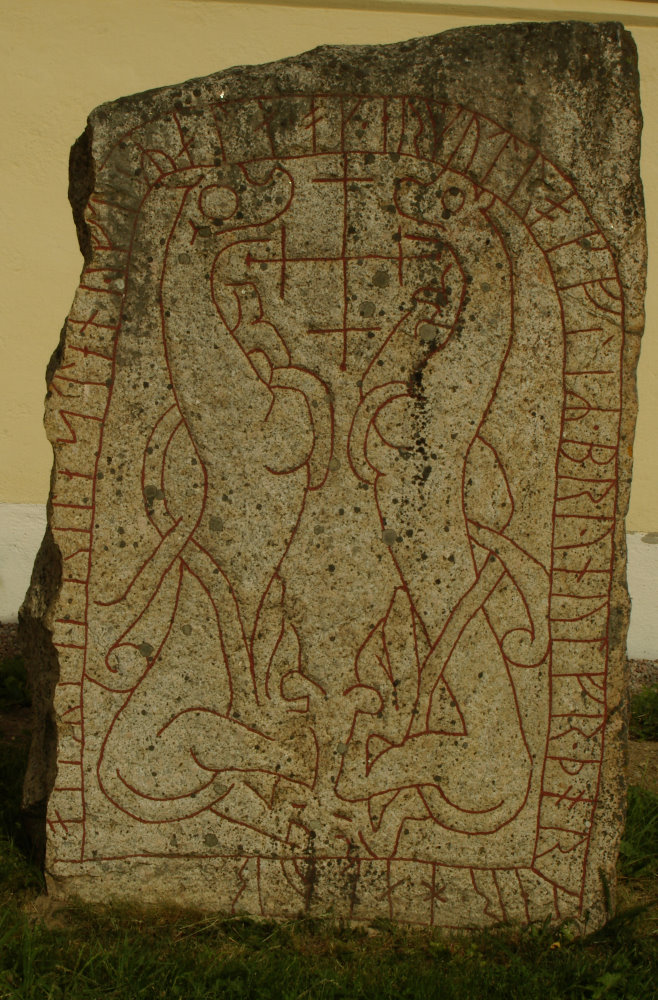
Runic inscription U 905 is located at Vänge Church, Uppland, Sweden.

This runic inscription, designated as U 905 in the Rundata catalog, is on a Viking Age memorial runestone that is located in Vänge, Uppsala County, Sweden, which is in the historic province of Uppland.

== Description ==
This inscription consists of runic text in the younger futhark surrounding two beasts and a Christian cross that is on a granite runestone which is 1.58 meters in height. It was known in the 17th century, and Olof Celsius is known to have inspected it in 1717 and 1726. Richard Dybeck, known for authoring the lyrics of the Swedish national anthem Du gamla, Du fria, attempted to locate the runestone in 1863 but was told that it had been walled up in the church. Before the historical nature of runestones was understood, they were often reused as materials in the construction of roads, bridges, and buildings. The stone was rediscovered during restoration of the church on September 27, 1965, under the threshold of the church porch and raised outside the church.

The runic text states that the stone was raised by a woman named Þorgerðr in memory of three different persons. Although she has the same name as a Norse pagan goddess, Þorgerðr, the inscription with its cross is clearly a Christian monument. Although unsigned, the stone has been attributed for stylistic reasons to a runemaster named Likbjörn. There are three inscriptions known to have been signed by Likbjörn, the now-lost U 1074 in Bälinge, U 1095 in Rörby, and U Fv1976;104, which was discovered in 1975 at the Uppsala Cathedral. Other runestones have been attributed to him based on stylistic analysis.

Locally the stone is known as the Vängesten.

== Inscription ==
=== Transliteration of the runes into Latin characters ===
* þorker * halfr... (t)o(t)(i)ʀ (l)(i)(t) ri(t)a sten yftiʀ ala * ok * ermutr ok f(t)iʀ * brynulfr *

=== Transcription into Old Norse ===
Þorgærðr, Hallfr[iðaʀ](?)/Hallfr[eðaʀ](?) dottiʀ, let retta stæin æftiʀ Ala/Alla ok Ærnmund ok æftiʀ Brynulf.

=== Translation in English ===
Þorgerðr, Hallfríðr's(?)/Hallfreðr's(?) daughter, had the stone erected in memory of Áli/Alli and Ernmundr and in memory of Brynjulfr.

== See also ==
- List of runestones
