= Fresta Church =

Coordinates: 59°31′04″N 17°57′24″E

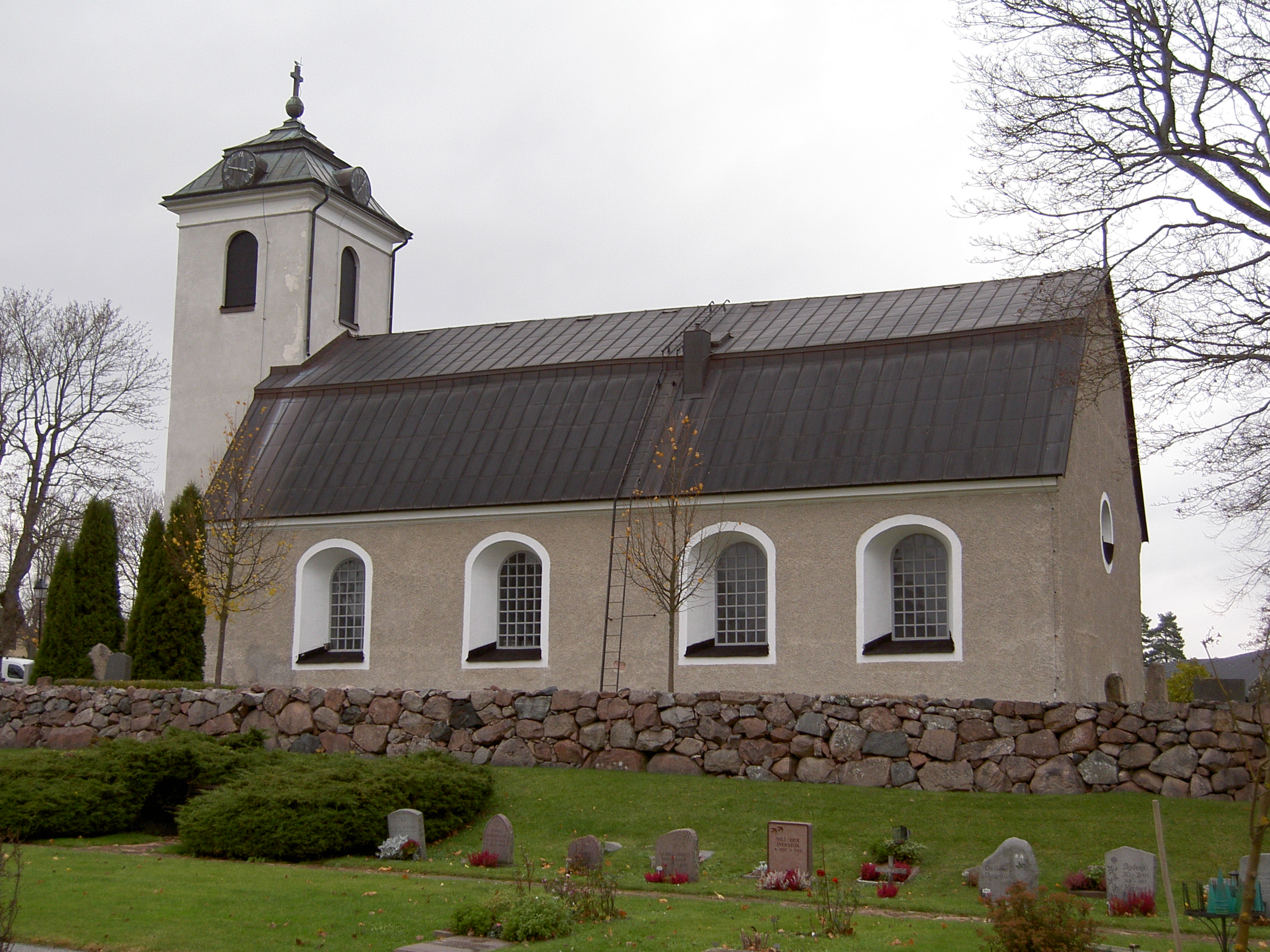
Fresta Church, external view

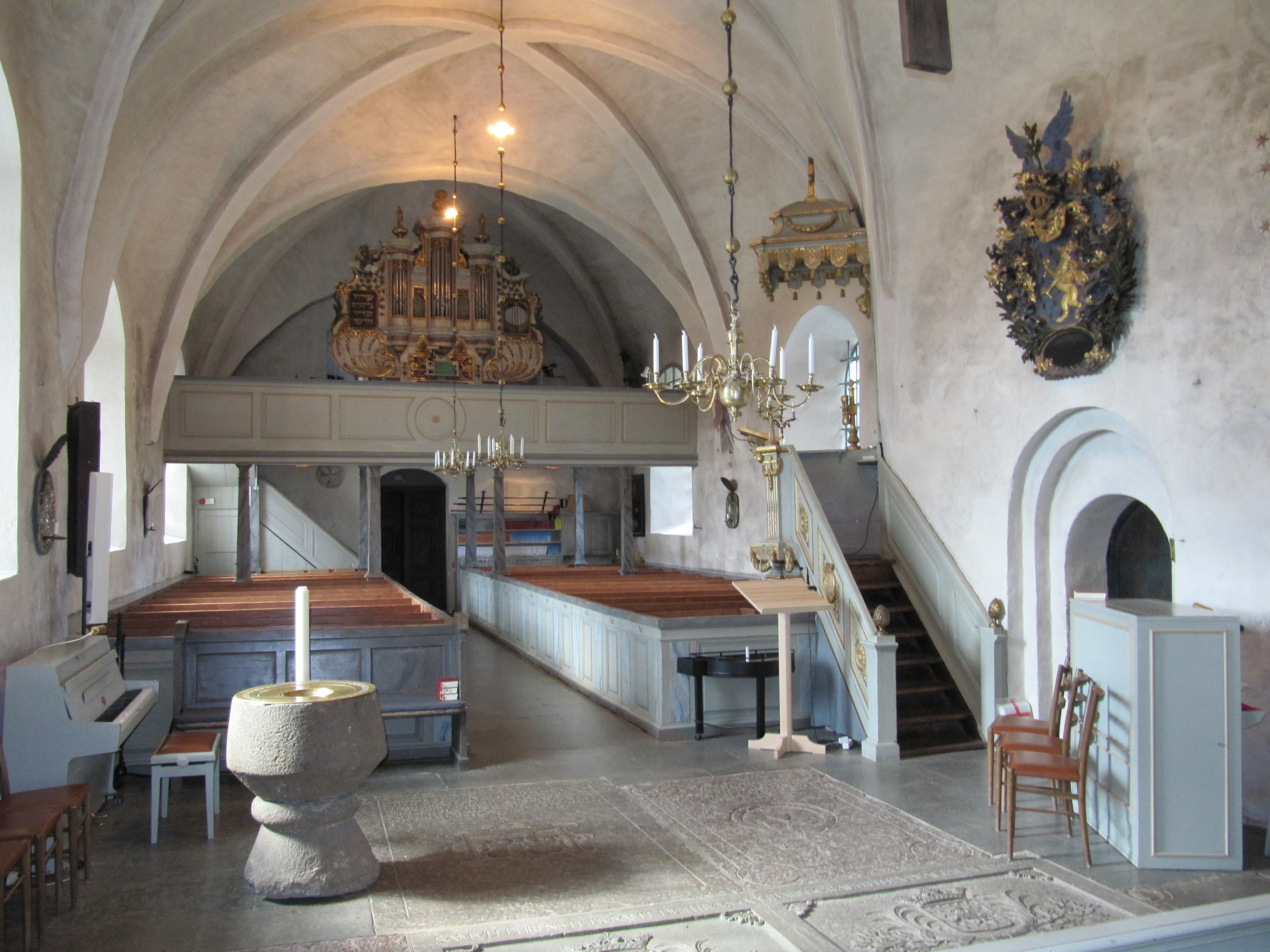
Fresta Church, interior view

Fresta Church (Swedish: Fresta kyrka) is a Lutheran church in the municipality of Upplands Väsby in Stockholm County, Sweden.

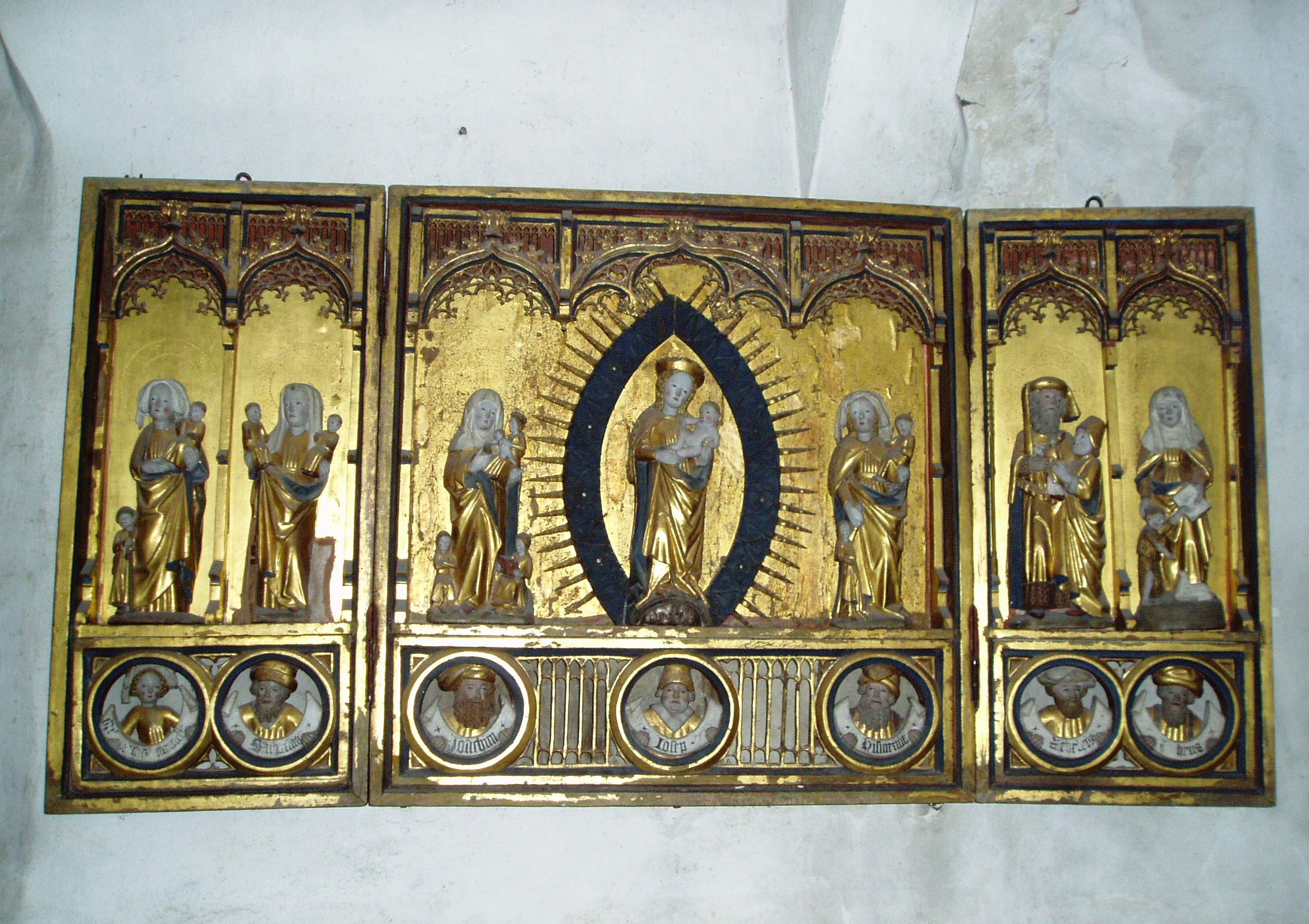
Altarpiece, made c. 1480 in northern Germany

== History and architecture ==
Fresta Church lies in an area with old cultural traditions. Adjacent to the church are no less than fifteen runestones, among them one of the so-called Jarlabanke Runestones (U261 in Rundata).

The oldest parts of the church, the vestry and the inner walls of the choir are from the early 14th century. The nave dates from later in the same century. A wooden nave may have pre-dated the current one- The church is built of fieldstone.

The church was heavily rebuilt in 1776, when it acquired the present external appearance. A clock tower was added to the western façade, the windows were enlarged, the walls all made the same heights and a new roof was constructed. Internally, the church still retains much of its medieval appearance. The vaults are from the 14th and 15th century; a few 15th-century frescos depicting the apostles still decorate the walls.

Of the church furnishings, the baptismal font and the triumphal cross both date from the 13th century. An altarpiece made in northern Germany circa 1480 deserve special mention. It depicts the Holy Family and relatives. Other furnishings are mostly from the 18th century. The unusually elaborate organ is from the 17th century.

== Gallery ==
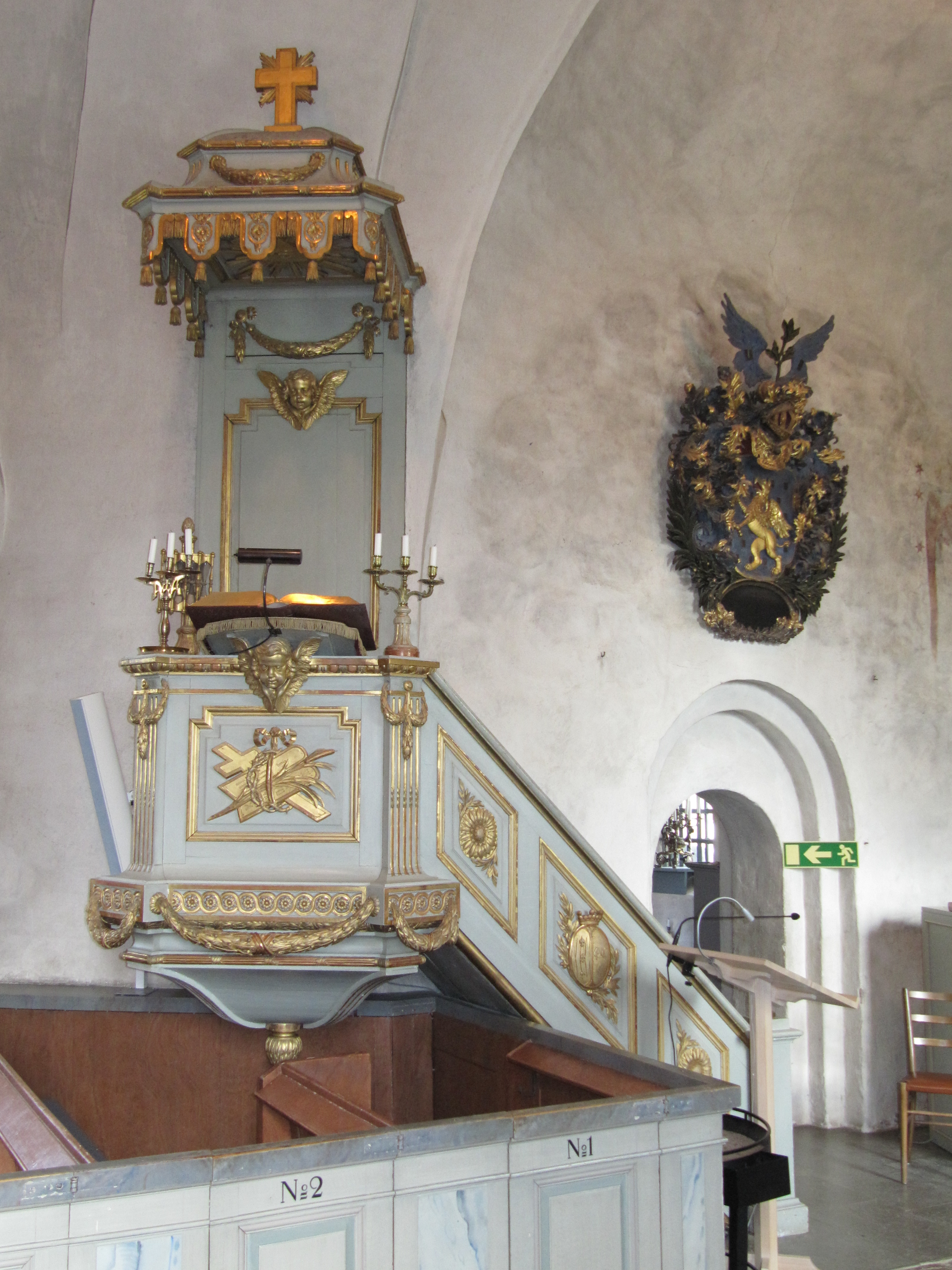
Pulpit

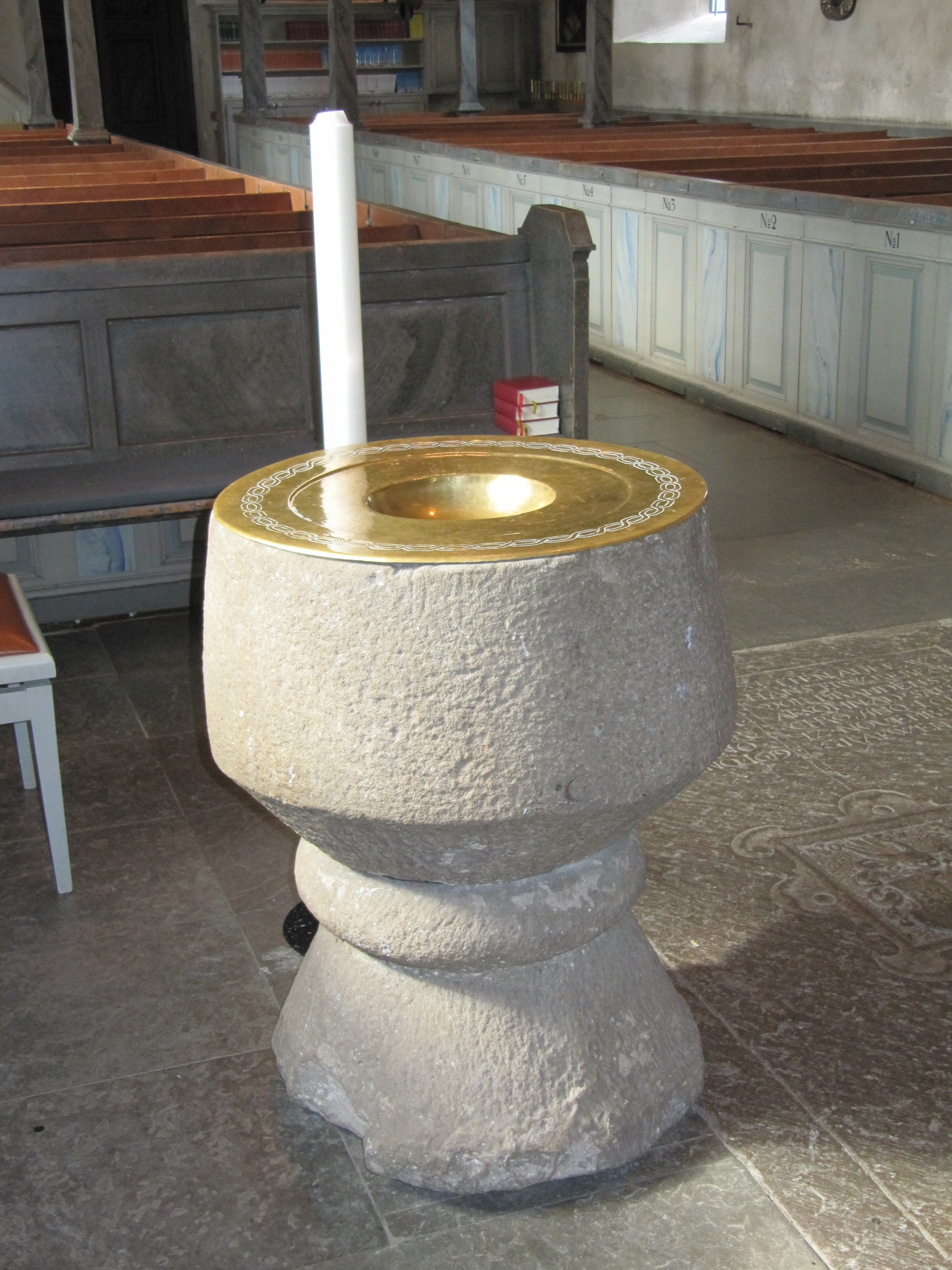
Baptismal font

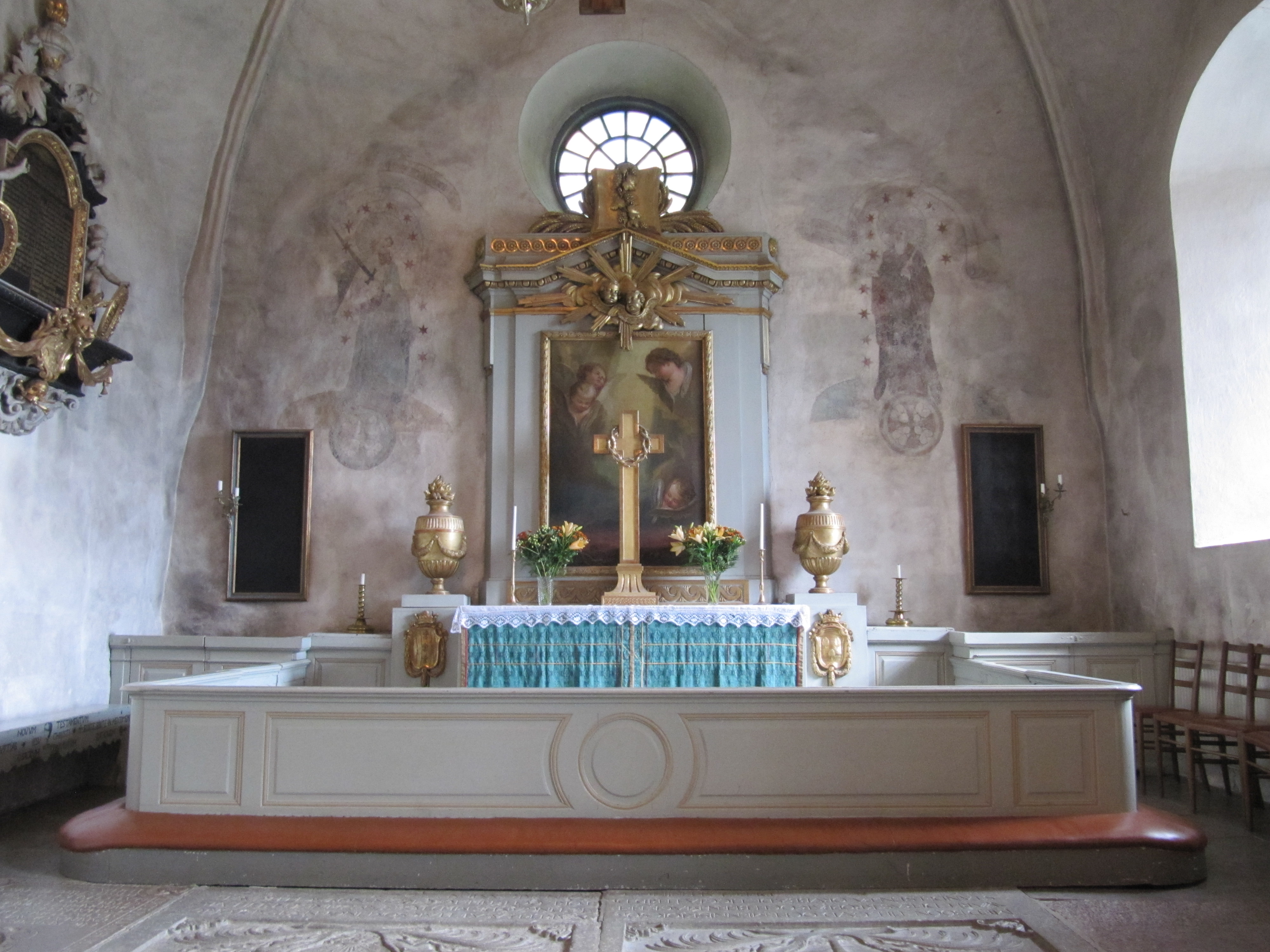
Altar
