= Uppland Runic Inscription Fv1976;104 =

Coordinates: 59°51′28″N 17°38′04″E

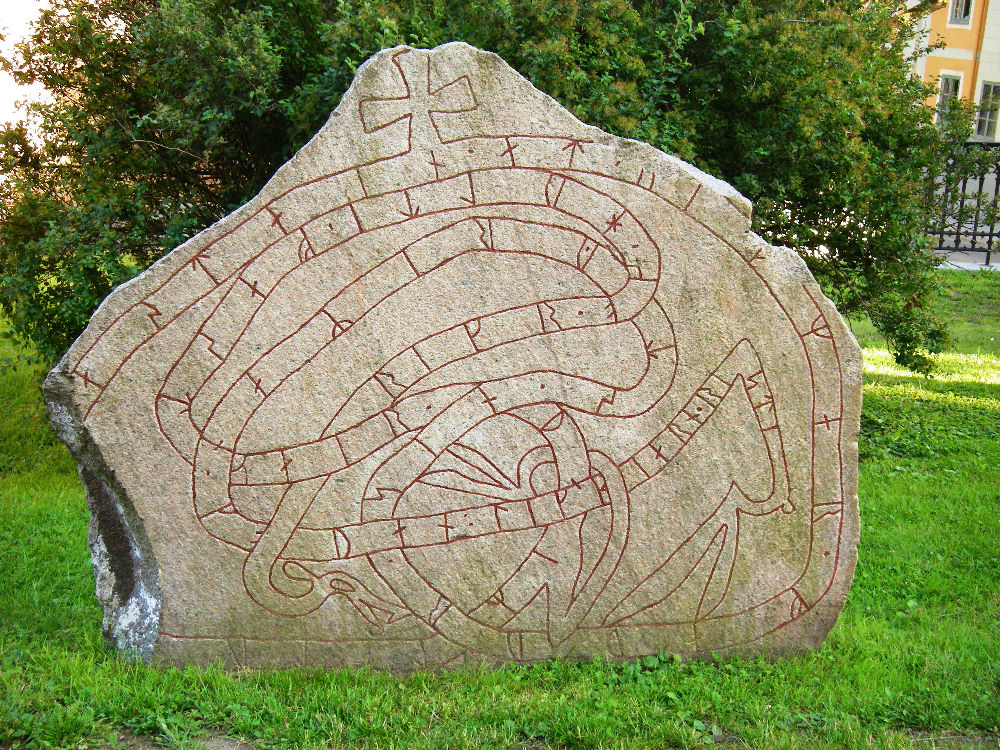
Runic inscription U Fv1976;104 is located at the Uppsala Cathedral, Uppland, Sweden.

This runic inscription, designated as U Fv1976;104 in the Rundata catalog, is on a Viking Age memorial runestone that is located at the Uppsala Cathedral, Uppland, Sweden.

== Description ==
This inscription consists of runic text in the younger futhark that is carved on an intertwined serpent under a small Christian cross. The red granite runestone, which is 1.65 meters in height and 1.64 meters wide, was discovered in May 1975 during excavation work at the Hornska chapel at the Uppsala Cathedral. Before the historical nature of runestones was understood, they were often reused as materials in the construction of roads, bridges, and buildings. The runestone is classified as being carved in runestone style Pr2, which is also known as Ringerike style. This is the classification for inscriptions where the runic bands end in serpent or beast heads seen in profile, but the serpents or beasts are not as elongated and stylized as in the Urnes style.

The runic text states that three sons raised the stone in memory of their father, Vígmarr, who is described as being styrimann goðan or "a good captain." A styrimann is a title often translated as "captain" and describes a person who was responsible for navigation and watchkeeping on a ship. This term is also used in inscriptions on Sö 161 in Råby, U 1011 in Örby, U 1016 in Fjuckby, and DR 1 in Hedeby. Part of the stone has been damaged with a word missing from the middle of the runic text, but based upon other inscriptions the missing word is likely to be the infinitive verb haggva, or "cut." The text is signed by a runemaster named Likbjörn. There are two other inscriptions known to have been signed by Likbjörn, the now-lost U 1074 in Bälinge and U 1095 in Rörby, although others have been attributed to him based on stylistic analysis.

The Rundata designation for this Uppland inscription, U Fv1976;104, refers to the year and page number of the issue of Fornvännen in which the runestone was first described.

== Inscription ==
=== Transliteration of the runes into Latin characters ===
rikr * ok * hulti * fastkair * þaiʀ * litu * ...a stain * at * uikmar * faþur * sin * styriman * koþan : likbiarn * risti

=== Transcription into Old Norse ===
Rikʀ/Rinkʀ/Ringʀ ok Hulti [ok] Fastgæiʀʀ þæiʀ letu ... stæin at Vigmar, faður sinn, styrimann goðan. Likbiorn risti.

=== Translation in English ===
Ríkr/Rekkr/Hringr and Holti and Fastgeirr, they had ... the stone in memory of Vígmarr, their father, a good captain. Líkbjôrn carved.

== See also ==
- List of runestones
