= Vänge =

- Location within Uppsala Location within Sweden
- Coordinates: 59°51′N 17°26′E
- Country: Sweden
- Province: Uppland
- County: Uppsala County
- Municipality: Uppsala Municipality

Area
  - Total: 0.78 km^{2} (0.30 sq mi)

Population (31 December 2020)
  - Total: 1,293
  - Density: 1,700/km^{2} (4,300/sq mi)
- Time zone: UTC+1 (CET)
  - Summer (DST): UTC+2 (CEST)

Vänge, previously known as Brunna, is a locality situated west of Uppsala in Uppsala Municipality, Uppsala County, Sweden with 1,331 inhabitants in 2010.

The community holds a medieval church and the building of the church began in the middle of the 12th century. It is built on the site of an older church which was probably made of wood. This preceding church was built in the end of the 11th century on the site of a holy well.

== See also ==
- Uppland Runic Inscription 905
- Vänge Church
