= Vänge Church, Uppland =

Religious building in Sweden

Coordinates: 59°51′22″N 17°26′06″E

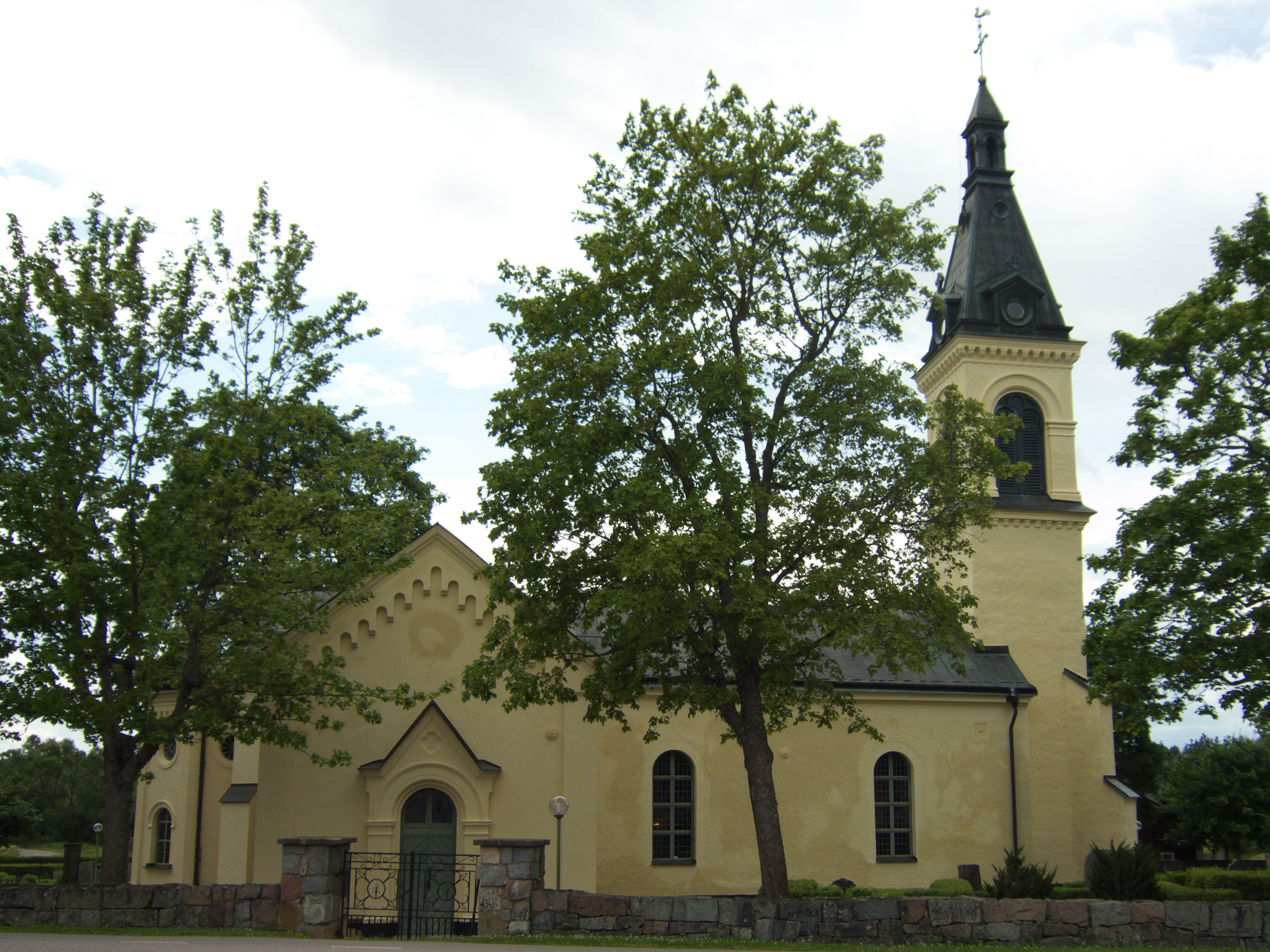
Vänge Church, external view

Vänge Church (Swedish: Vänge kyrka) is a Lutheran church at Vänge in Uppsala County, Sweden. It lies in the Archdiocese of Uppsala of the Church of Sweden.

== History and architecture ==
Vänge Church dates from the Middle Ages, and the oldest parts of the building date from the 13th century. It was successively expanded during the 14th and 15th centuries. The latest medieval additions - among them, the brick vaults inside the church - were probably funded by a local guild called the Guild of St. John the Baptist, that existed in Vänge at the time. The church however derives much of its present-day appearance from a reconstruction and enlargement carried out in 1882–86, during which the church was re-made in Neo-Romanesque style both internally and externally. The reconstruction was carried out after the parish had been merged with neighbouring Läby parish, and the new congregation needed a larger church. In 1935 an attempt to restore the interior to its medieval appearance was carried out. During this time, lime frescos from the 1480s by Albertus Pictor (c.1440–c.1507) were uncovered.

The church has a baptismal font dating from the 12th century. The pulpit was added in 1935 and is adorned by three sculptures by Anton Lundberg. The altarpiece from 1935 was painted by Eva Bagge (1871-1964).

West of the church lies the parsonage, which consists of a main building (built 1849–50) and two wings (18th century) as well as a well-preserved tithe barn. The former church school is also located nearby. All together, these buildings constitute an unusually well-preserved ensemble.

A runestone (Uppland Runic Inscription 905) is located adjacent to the church.

== Gallery ==
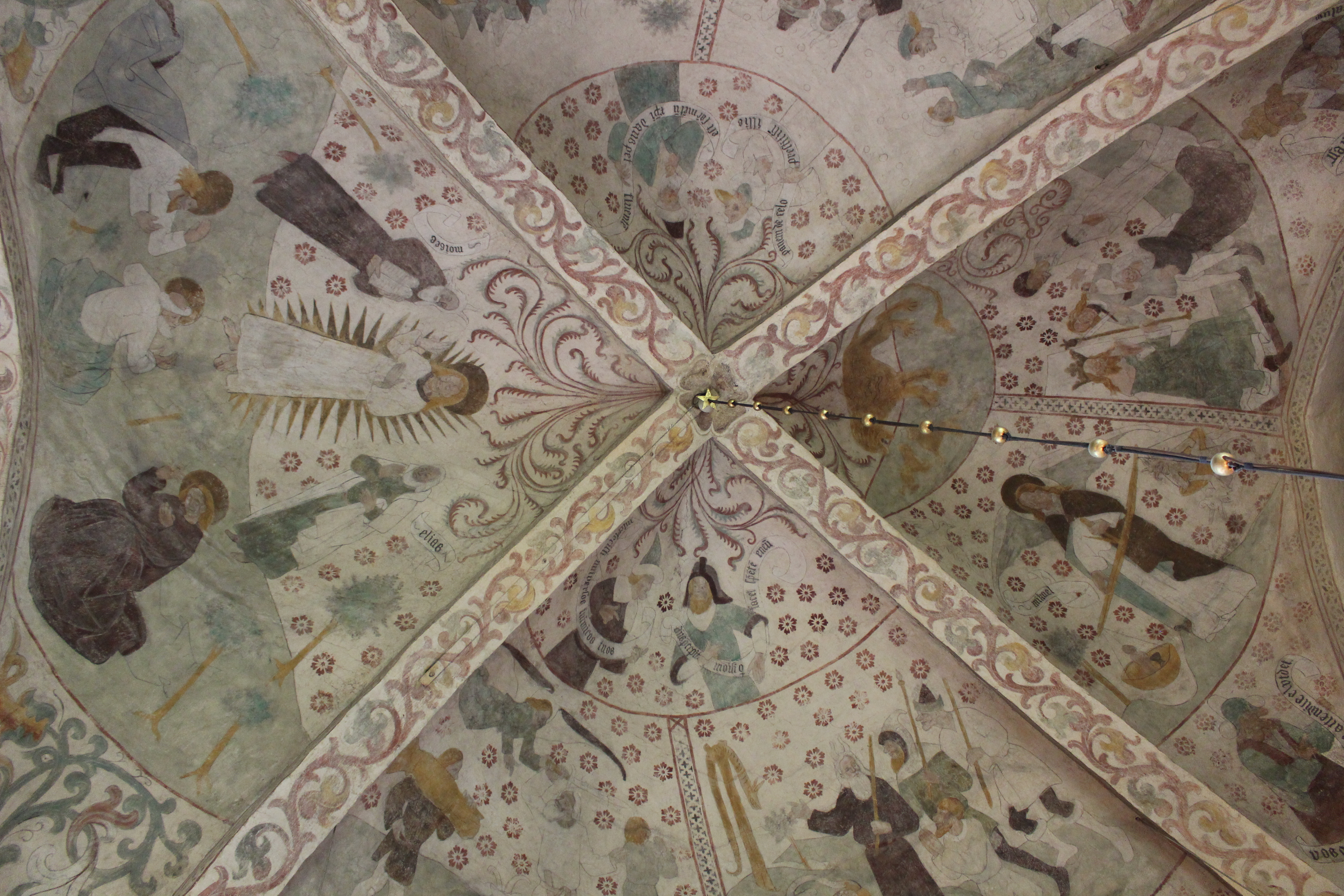
Ceiling

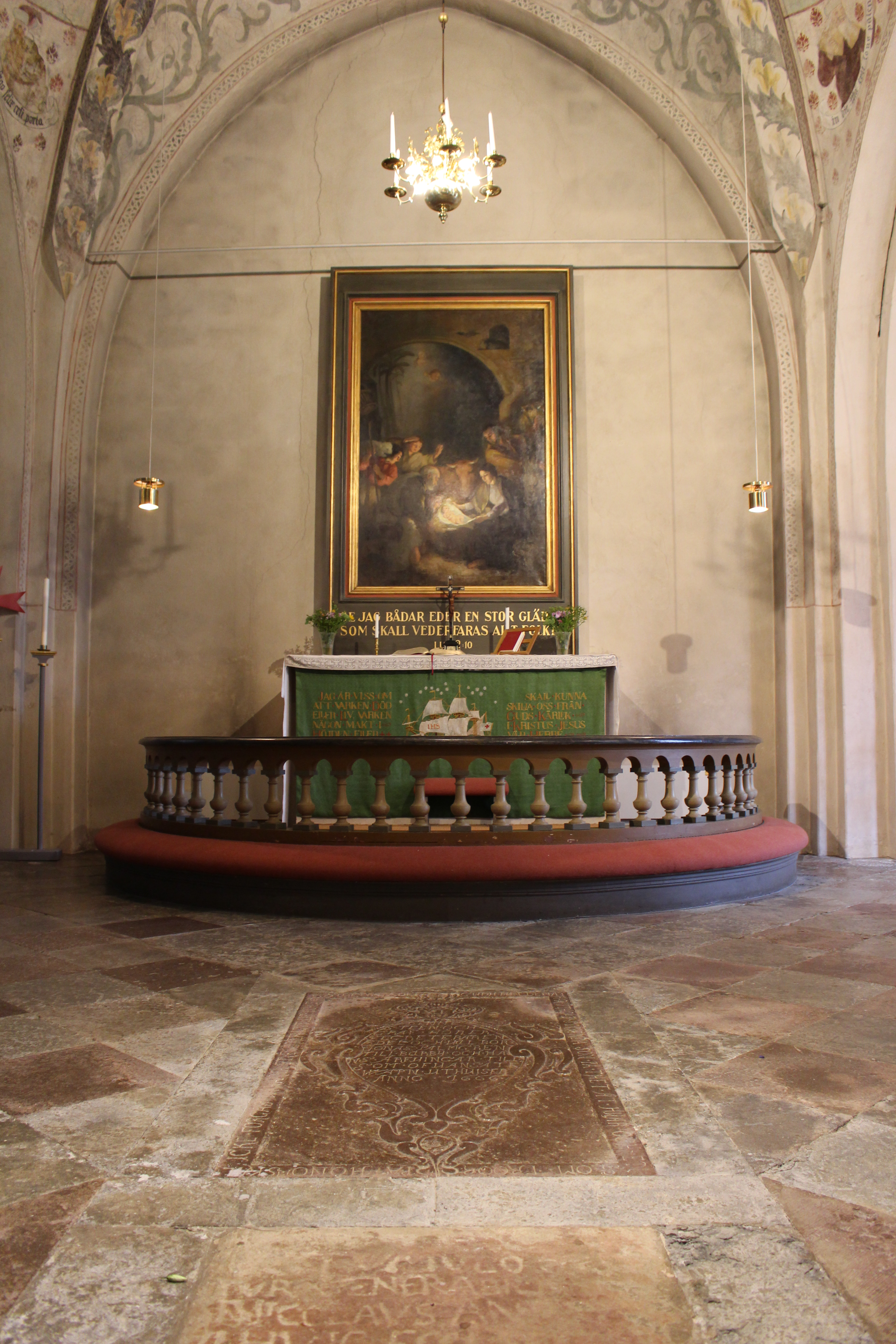
Altar

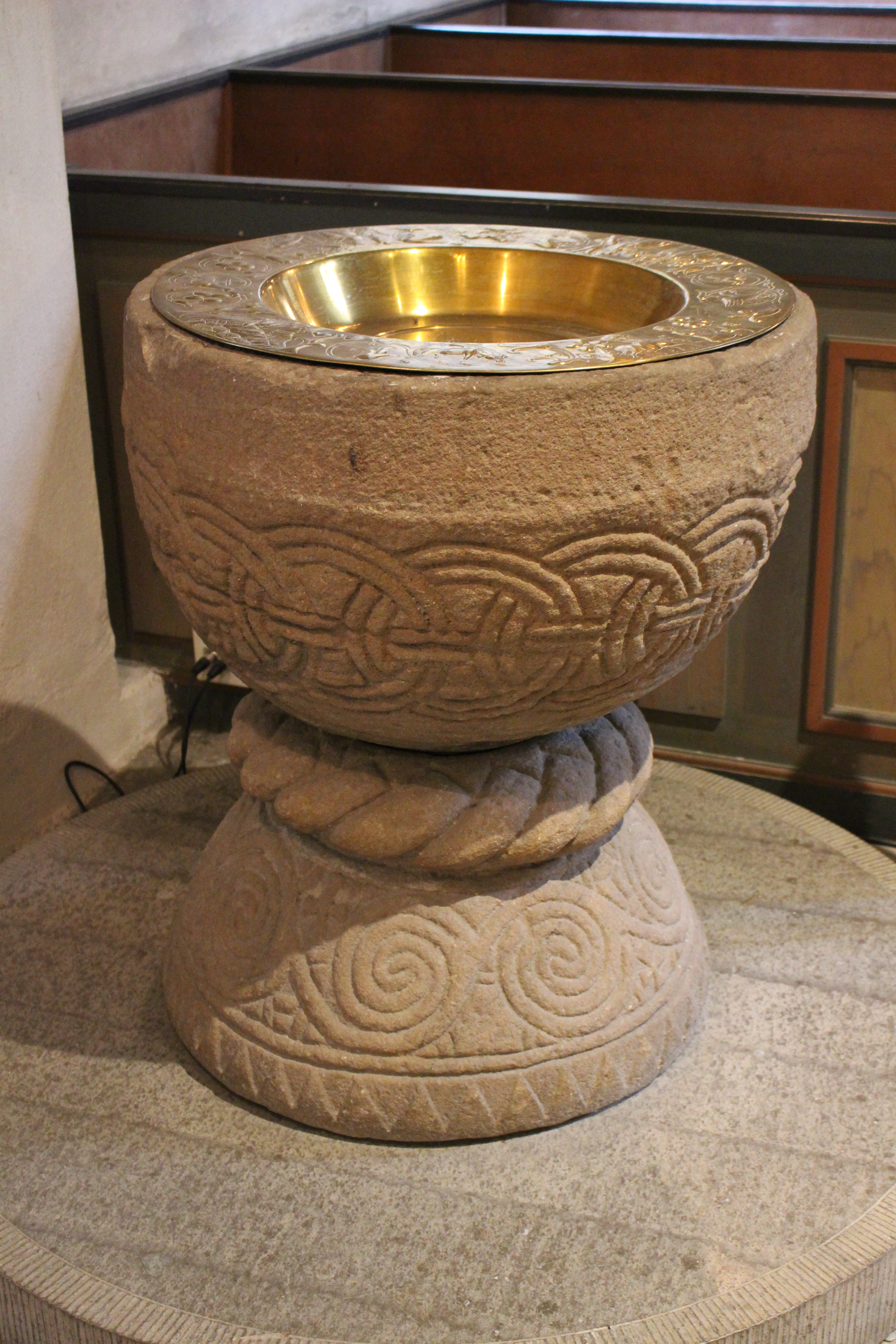
Baptismal font

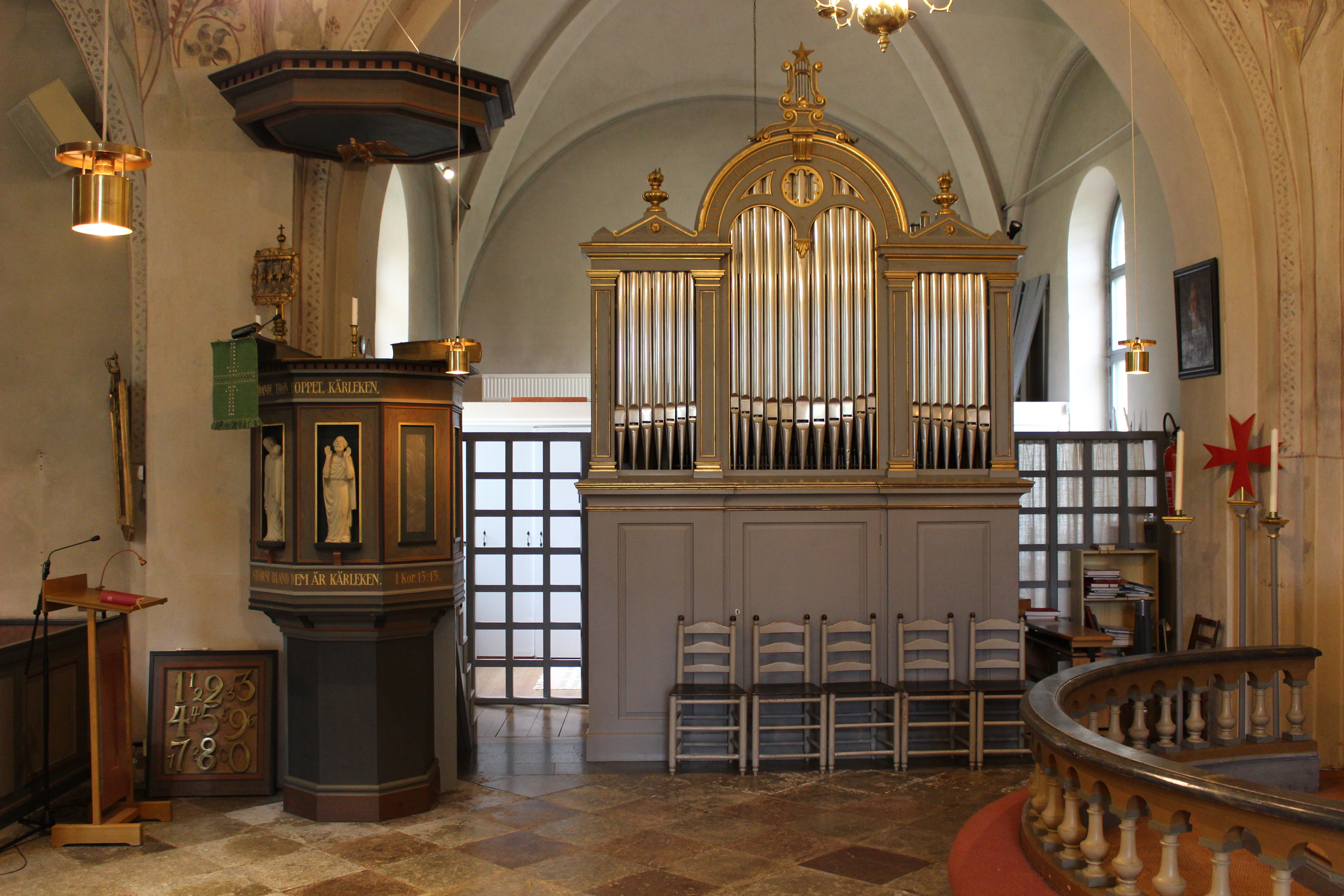
Organ and pulpit
