= Fjuckby =

- Hamlet
- Interactive map of Fjuckby
- Country: Sweden
- Municipality: Uppsala Municipality
- County: Uppsala County
- Province: Uppland

Area
  - Total: 0.18 km^{2} (0.069 sq mi)

Population (2000)
  - Total: 65
- Time zone: UTC+1 (CET)
  - Summer (DST): UTC+2 (CEST)

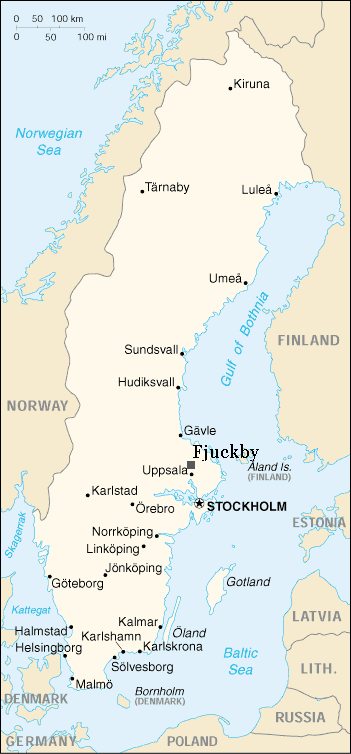
Location of Fjuckby

Fjuckby (Swedish pronunciation: [ˈfjɵ̌kːbʏ]) is a village in Uppsala Municipality, Uppsala County, Sweden, located about 15 km (9.3 km) north of the central city Uppsala along European route E4. The village has a population of 65 people (as of 2000) within an area of 18 hectares (44.5 acres). Known as a site for runestones, the village's name has generated worldwide interest in the village.

== History ==
Fjuckby is first mentioned in 1316. Prior to the 1930s, the village was known as Fjukeby. In the 1930s, the spelling of the name of this small village was changed to Fjuckby. With the rise of international travel by Anglophones, and the rise of global communications, English-speaking tourists have traveled to Fjuckby out of amusement at the name in order to ridicule it. Inhabitants of Fjuckby endured years of ridicule over the name, which is not only similar to the English word "fuck", but also to the Swedish juck ("pelvic thrust").

Over time, some residents grew weary from constantly having to take a tiresome defensive stance, and suffered from constant teasing. In addition, the name Fjuckby made it difficult to sell property or run a successful business.

In December 2006, 15 of the inhabitants of Fjuckby applied to change the name of their village. The request was sent to the Swedish government surveyors' office, and requested that the office grant permission for the name to be changed back to Fjukeby. The request complained of suffering from an epidemic of "weariness, embarrassment and conditioned shame." In particular, the place name 'Fjuckby' arouses ridicule, teasing and hilarity in the general public and spontaneously and repeatedly leads to associations concerning certain carnal activities between people and between animals. The change was not allowed as only 15 of 65 residents were in favour of the change.

== Location ==
Fjuckby is located north of Uppsala in central Uppsala County. Uppsala County is located on Sweden's east coast, between the Gulf of Bothnia in the north and Lake Mälaren in the south. (Coordinates: 59°58′N 17°36′E.)

== Runestone ==
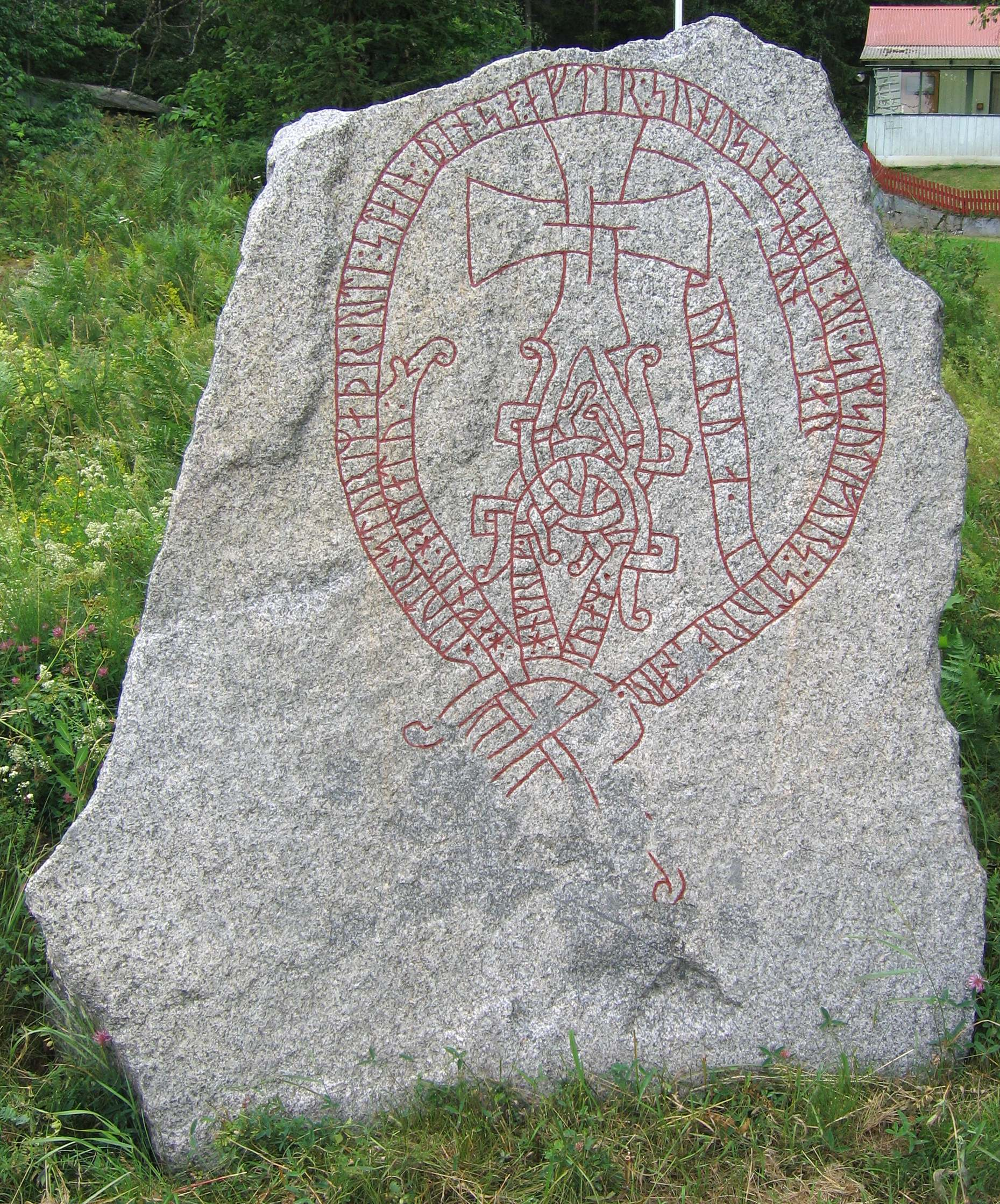
Runestone U 1016 in Fjuckby.

One of the runestones Fjuckby contains is the Greece Runestone U 1016, which commemorates in its inscription that the location of the death of a person was at home. A recently discovered runic section inside a main runic band on the runestone contains an inscription that commemorates a son who died in Greece. In particular, the stone reads:

Captain Liut erected this stone in memory of his sons. One was called Aki, who was lost overseas. <?) captained a merchant ship. He reached Greek harbours. At home he died.

In a study by Fred Wulf, Wulf proposes that the added message emphasizes that the sponsor's other son Hafnir had died at home.

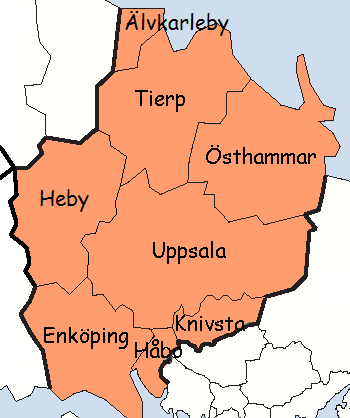
Fjuckby within Uppsala County

== See also ==
- Fugging, Upper Austria
