= Jarlabanke Runestones =

Group of runestones in Uppland, Sweden

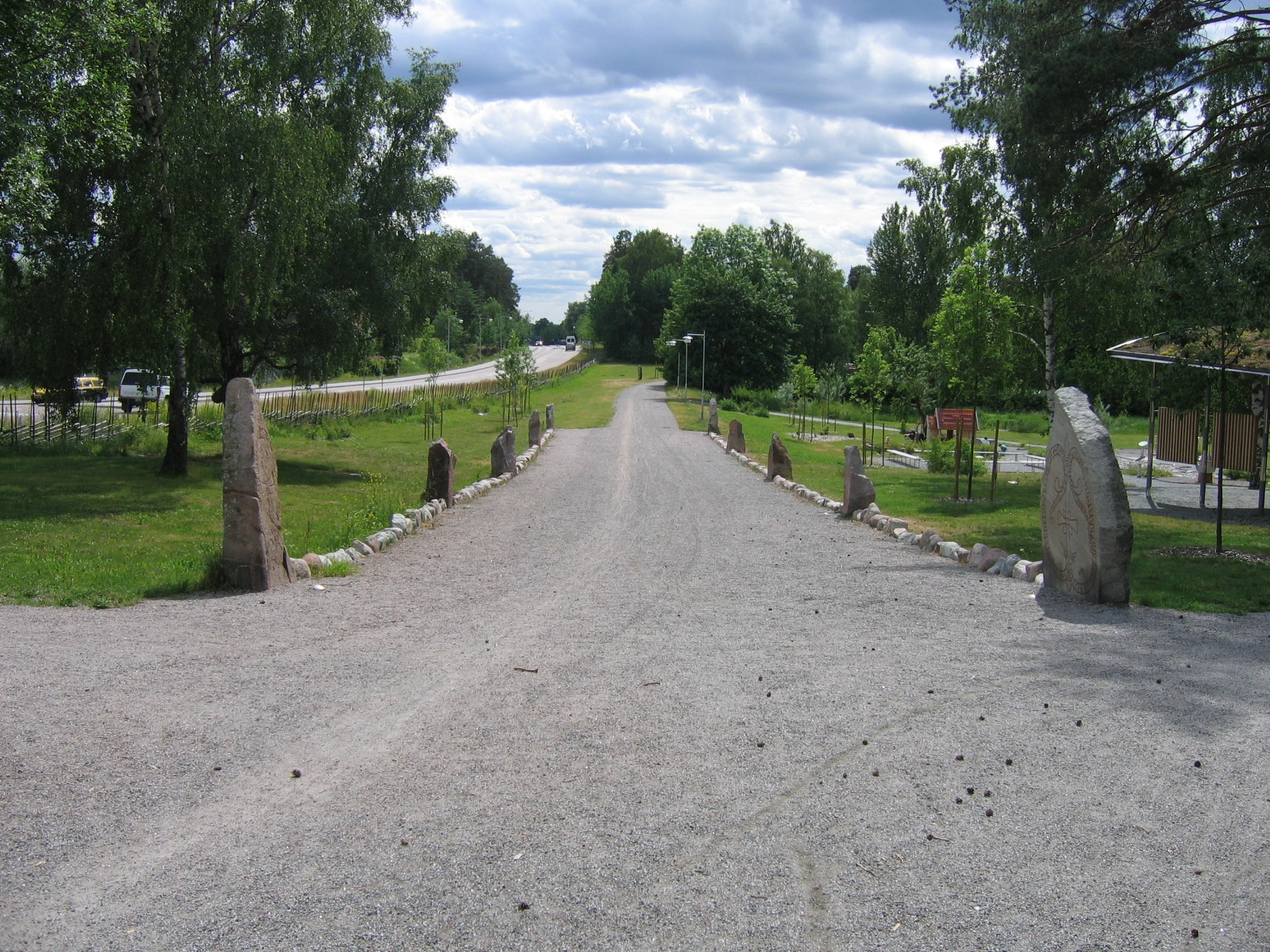
Two of the Jarlabanke Runestones at the entrance to the causeway "Jarlabanke's bridge"

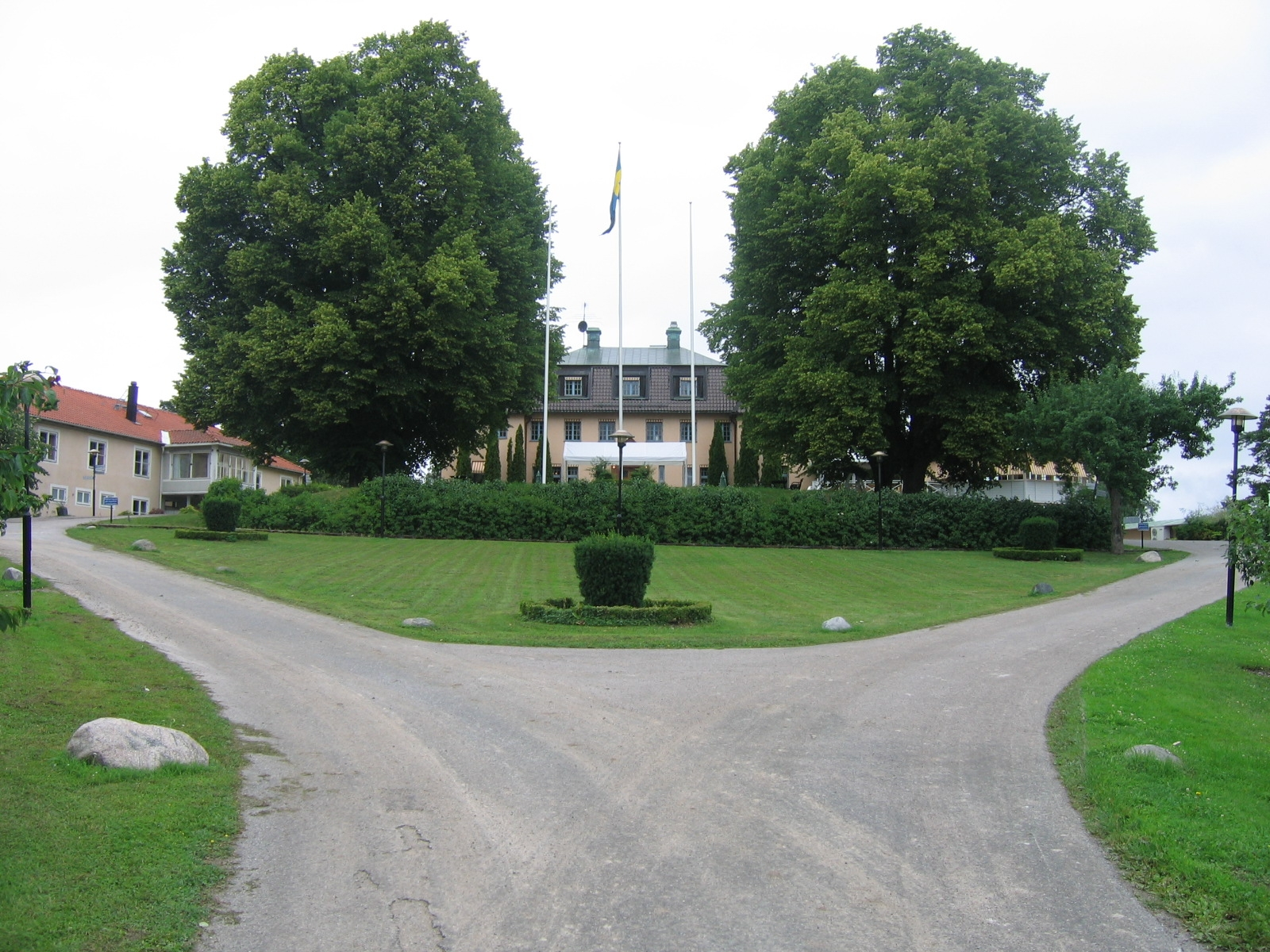
Jarlabanke probably lived on the estate which today is called Såsta. As of 2007, it is a conference centre.

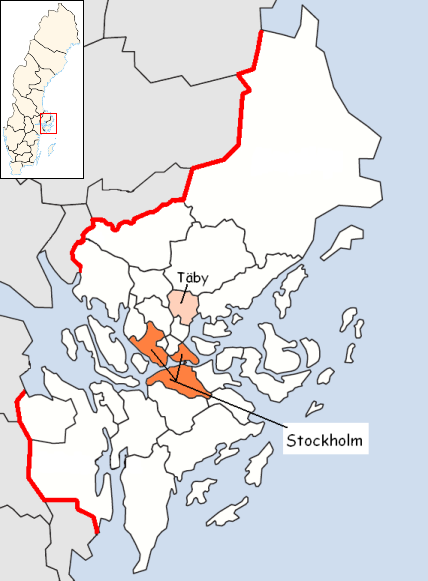
Location of Täby in Sweden

The Jarlabanke Runestones (Swedish: Jarlabankestenarna) is the name of about 20 runestones written in Old Norse with the Younger Futhark rune script in the 11th century, in Uppland, Sweden.

They were ordered by what appears to have been a chieftain named Jarlabanke Ingefastsson and his clan (Swedish: Jarlabankeätten), in Täby. Jarlabanke was probably a hersir (chieftain of a hundred) responsible for the local leidang organization and on several runestones, he stated that he was a Christian and not a Pagan.

Omeljan Pritsak has remarked that Jarlabanke's prominent position and property show that he and his clan profited from taking part in the Danegelds and from the services that men of his clan provided as mercenaries in the Varangian Guard and in Kievan Rus'.

== Inscription ==
Five of the runestones contain very much the same message: "Jarlabanke had these stones made after himself while he was alive. He made this bridge for his soul. He alone owned all of Täby". One stone at the church of Vallentuna also shows the following text on its second side: "Jarlabanke had this stone made after himself while he was alive. He made this assembly location and he alone owned this hundred".

The so-called Jarlabanke's bridge is a causeway in Täby which was originally bordered by four runestones and many raised stones. It is about 116 metres (381 ft) long and 6.4 metres (21 ft) wide, and there were inscriptions (U 164 and U 165) by Jarlabanke both at the southern and the northern end of the causeway. One of the runestones was moved during his lifetime to the location of the local assembly of the Vallentuna Hundred, where it received a new text and it was replaced with a new fifth one at Jarlabanke's bridge and which had a different design.

Three other runestones present Jarlabanke as the builder of roads and bridges, and ten or so mention his family members making it possible to follow his family during four generations. His pride at building roads and bridges shows that this was something that gave prestige in 11th-century Sweden.

== Controversy ==
The inscriptions have led to a controversy on the meaning of the Old Norse verb eiga ("to own"), and to a debate on the origins on the hundred division. It is debated whether he really owned the hundred or if he was appointed as its chieftain (hersir) by the King of Sweden, and a final conclusion is probably impossible to arrive at.

== The runestones ==
Besides the runestones treated in this article, there are many others that were raised by Jarlabanke and his clansmen such as U 101, U 135, U 136, U 137, U 143, U 147, U 309 and U 310. However, these runestones are treated separately as they were raised in connection with Estrid, the female progenitor of the Jarlabanke clan.

The remaining runestones that are associated with Jarlabanke's relatives are: U 100, U 104, U 112, U 133, U 141, U 151, U 160, U 161, U 225, U 226, U 328, U 336, U 343 and U 344.

=== U 127 ===
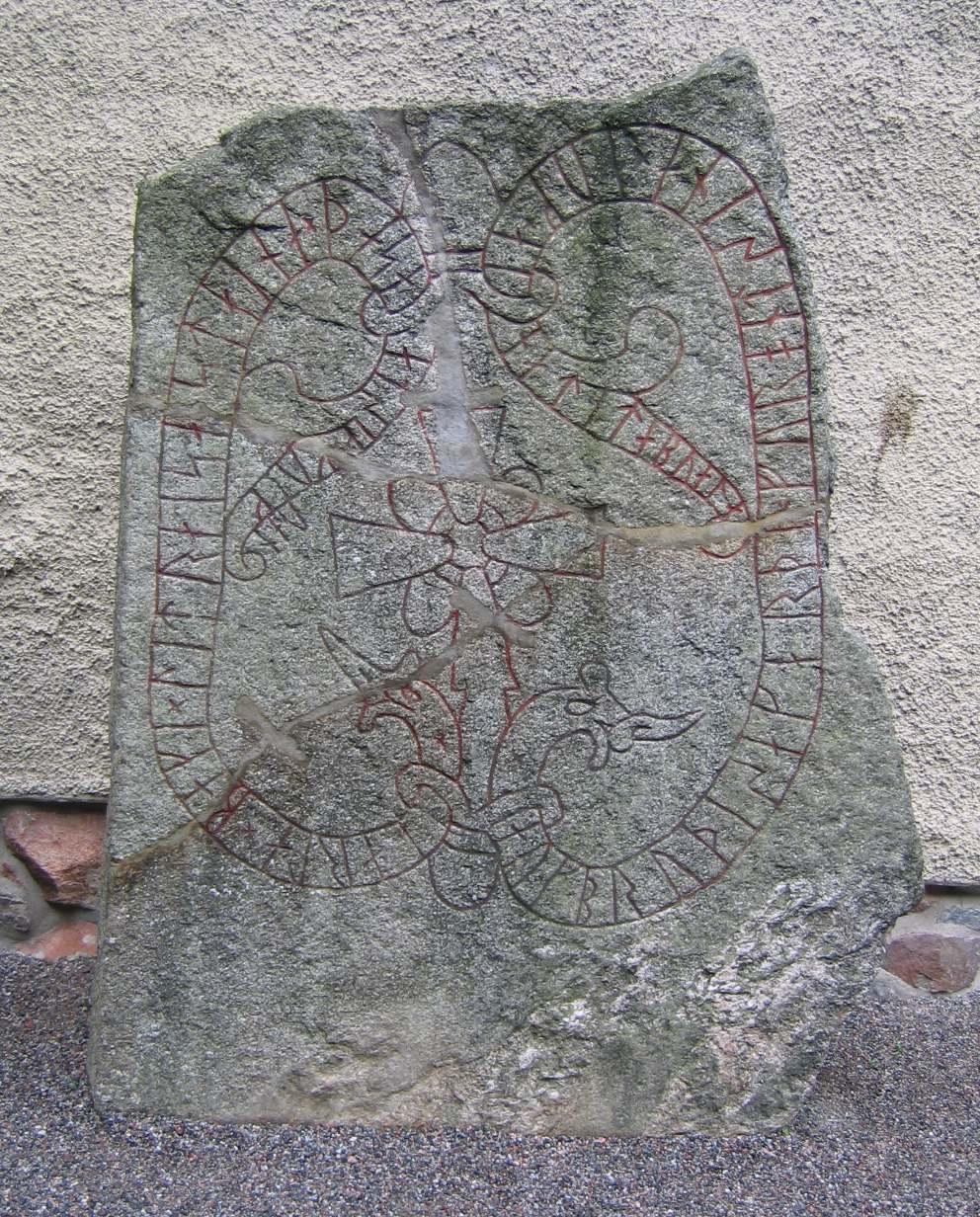
The runestone U 127

This runestone in the style Pr2 (first half of the 11th century) is located at the church of Danderyd. It was found in the walls of the church and had probably been moved quite a distance from Täby before it was used in the church. On this rune stone, Jarlabanke declared that he had the whole of Täby under his command and that he had made a bridge and raised several rune stones in honour of himself while he was alive.

× iarla×baki × lit raisa [×] staina × þasa at sik × kuikuan × auk bru þisa karþi × fur ont sina × auk × ain ati tabu ala-
{} Iarlabanki {} let ræisa {} stæina {} þessa at sik {} kvikvan, {} ok bro þessa gærði {} fyr and sina, {} ok {} æinn atti Tæby alla[n].
Jarlabanki had these stones raised in memory of himself while alive, and made this bridge for his spirit, and (he) alone owned all of Tábýr.

=== U 140 ===
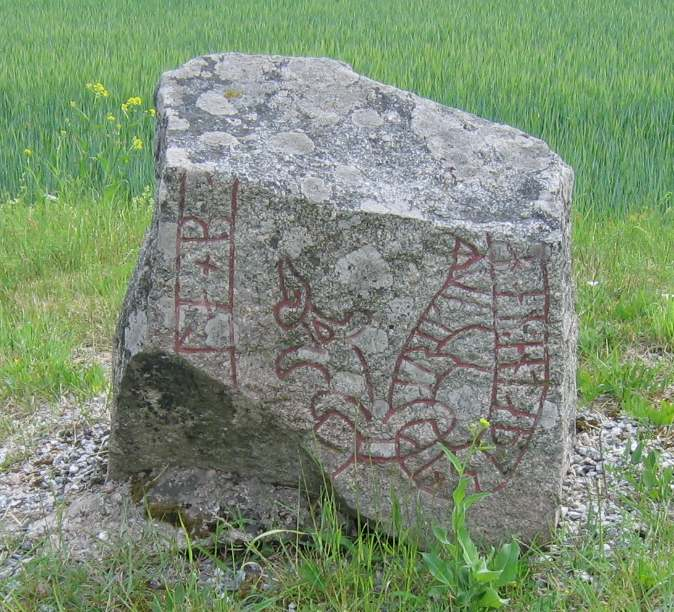
The runestone U 140

This fragment is located in Broby, near the Broby bro Runestones and U 150. It was discovered among the ground stones of a smaller building. It is one of two Jarlabanke runestones that mention men who travelled abroad (the other one is U 136), but it is not known who the traveller mentioned in the fragment was. It also belongs to the Greece Runestones and it is treated there as well.

× ...la×b(a)... ... han : entaþis * i kirikium
{} [Iar]laba[nki] ... Hann {} ændaðis {} i Grikkium.
Jarlabanki ... He met his end in Greece.

=== U 142 ===
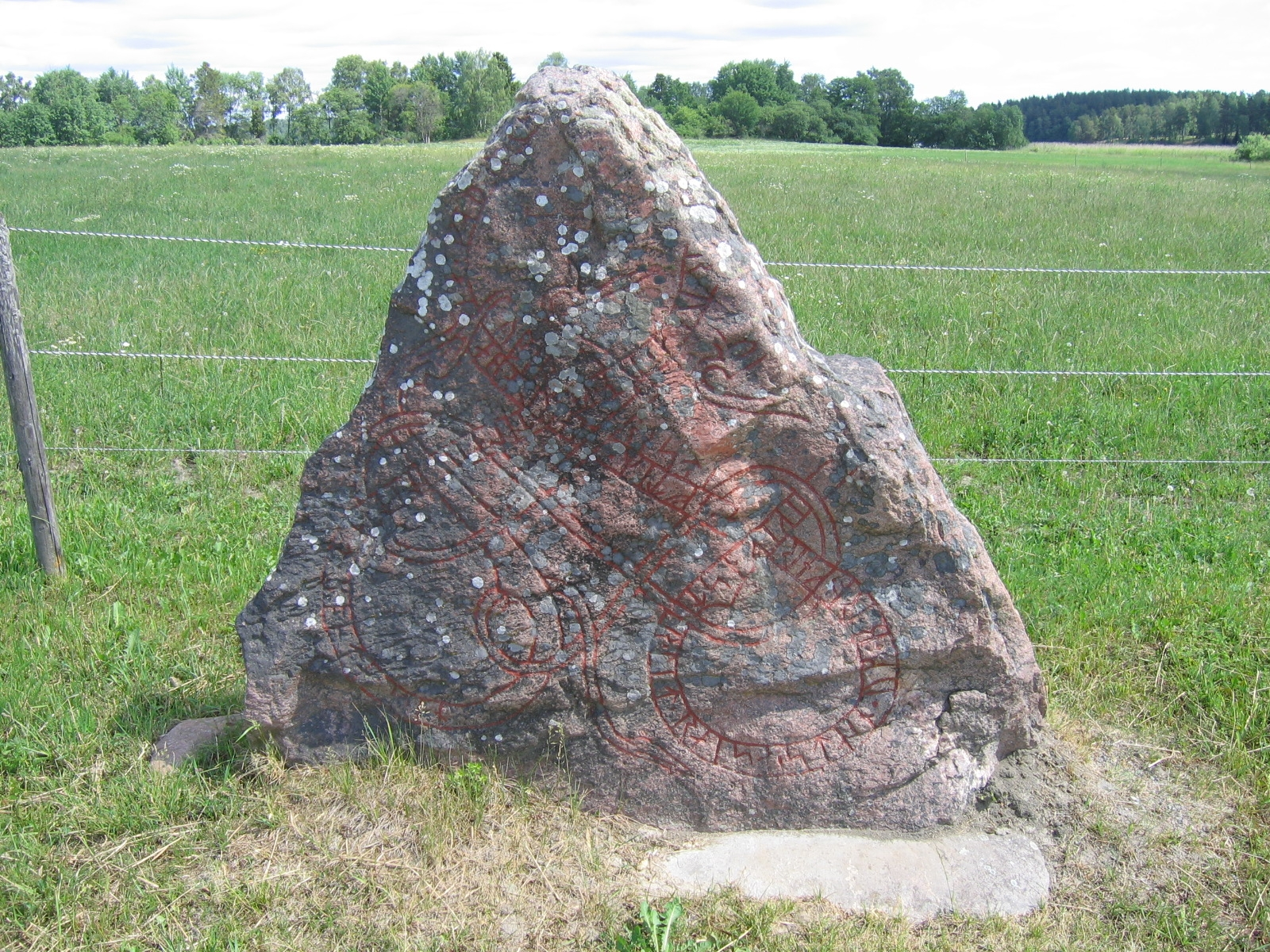
The runestone U 142

This rune stone in the style Pr4 (second half of the 11th century) is located in Fällbro, and it is one of the most important Jarlabanke rune stones as it was raised in his memory after his death. It was raised by Jarlabanke's wife Ketiley, and his son Ingifastr Jarlabankesson. The stone also informs that it was made by Öpir, who was the most productive runemaster of his time.

ikifastr ' lit ' raisa ' stain * uk ' bro ' kera ' eftiʀ ' iarlabaka ' faþur ' s[in ' uk ' sun ' io]runa ' uk ' ketilau lit ' at ' bonta ' sin ybir risti
Ingifastr {} let {} ræisa {} stæin {} ok {} bro {} gæra {} æftiʀ {} Iarlabanka, {} faður {} sinn {} ok {} sun {} Iorunaʀ, {} ok {} Kætiløy let {} at {} bonda {} sinn. Øpiʀ risti.
Ingifastr had the stone raised and the bridge made in memory of Jarlabanki, his father, Jórunnr's son. And Ketiley had (it raised/made) in memory of her husbandman. Œpir carved.

=== U 148 ===
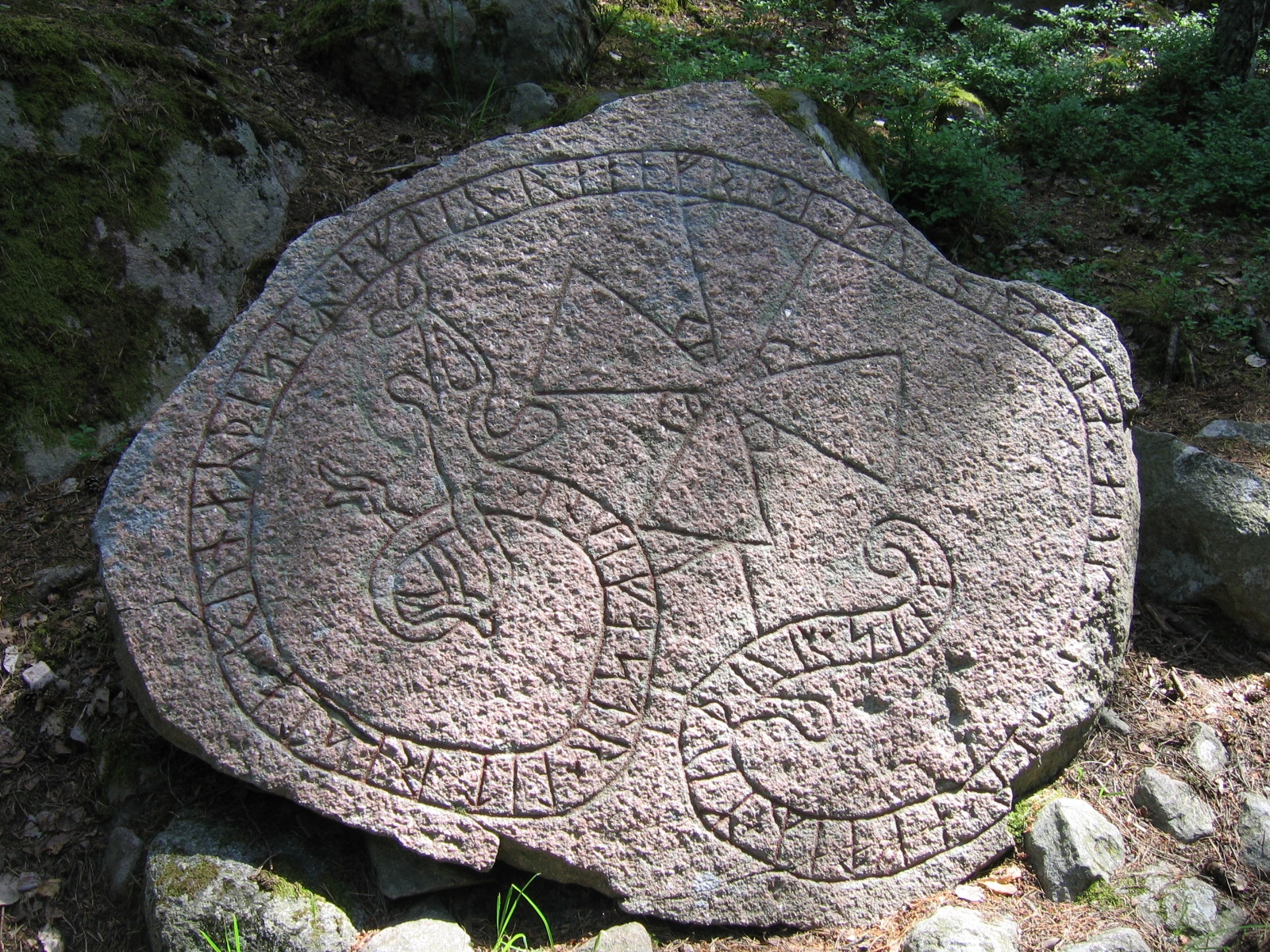
The runestone U 148

This runestone in the style Pr3 (third quarter of the 11th century) is located in the forest south-west of Hagby, where a road once crossed a brook, and only a few hundred metres from U 147. The road was made by Jarlabanke's clan and it went from the bay of Edsviken to Täby. The rune stone informs that it was raised by Ingifastr Eysteinsson (Jarlabanke's father) in memory of his wife Ragnfríðr, together with his son Hemingr (Jarlabanke's half-brother).

× inkifastr × lit × rista × runaʀ þisaʀ × aftiʀ × rahnfriþi × kuinu × sina × auk × -[m-](n)kr × aftiʀ × muþur × sina
{} Ingifastr {} let {} rista {} runaʀ þessaʀ {} æftiʀ {} Ragnfriði, {} kvinnu {} sina, {} ok {} [Hæ]m[i]ngʀ {} æftiʀ {} moður {} sina.
Ingifastr had these runes carved in memory of Ragnfríðr, his wife; and Hemingr in memory of his mother.

=== U 149 ===
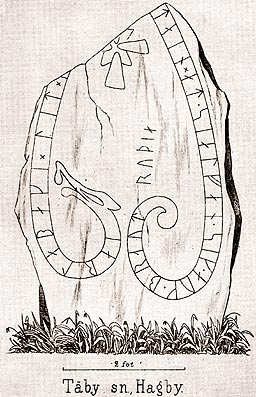
The runestone U 149, in a drawing made by Richard Dybeck from 1840

This runestone was located in Hagby. It has, however, disappeared, but it survives in form of a drawing made by Richard Dybeck in 1840. The rune stone is one of those that Jarlabanke made in his own memory and it tells that was raised in connection with his constructing a path.

[iarlabaki × lit × -... ...tain × at * sialfan * sik * auk * braut ruþia]
Iarlabanki {} let {} ... [s]tæin {} at {} sialfan {} sik {} ok {} braut ryðia.
Jarlabanki had ... the stone in memory of himself and cleared a path.

=== U 150 ===
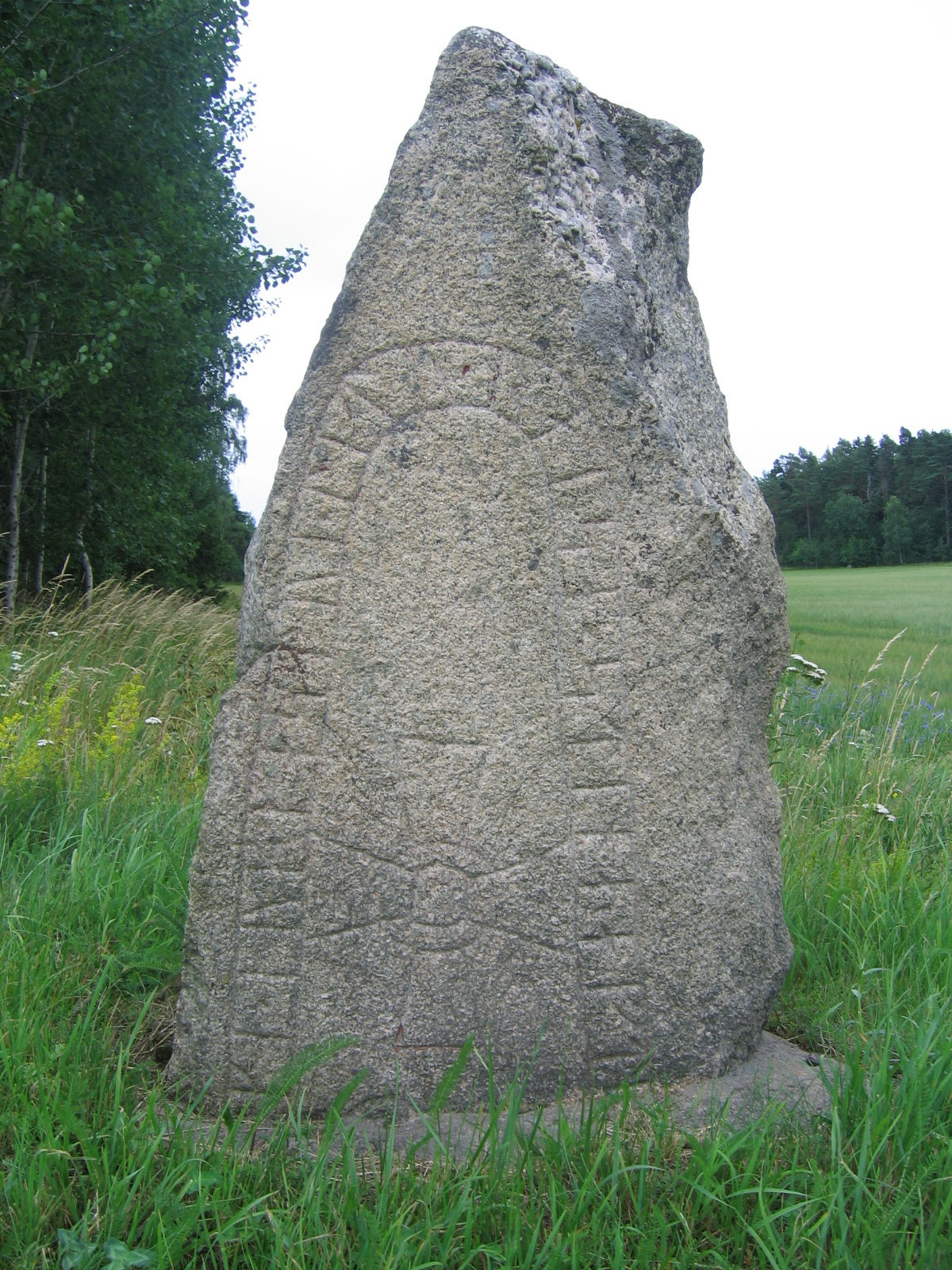
The runestone U 150

This runestone is possibly in the style Fp (first half of the 11th century) and it is located in Karby, along the road, at a small distance from U 140 and the Broby bro Runestones. The lower part of it has been lost, and today it is secured in the ground with a foundation of concrete. The rune stone informs that Jarlabanke and his wife Fastvé raised it in memory of their son Sveinn. The style of the stone is, however, problematic since it may be in the style of Jarlabanke's parents' generation.

* iarla*b]aki * auk * fastui * litu * raisa * stina * aftiʀ [* suain * sun * sin
{} Iarlabanki {} ok {} Fastvi {} letu {} ræisa {} stæina {} æftiʀ {} Svæin, {} sun {} sinn.
Jarlabanki and Fastvé had the stones raised in memory of Sveinn, their son.

=== U 164 ===
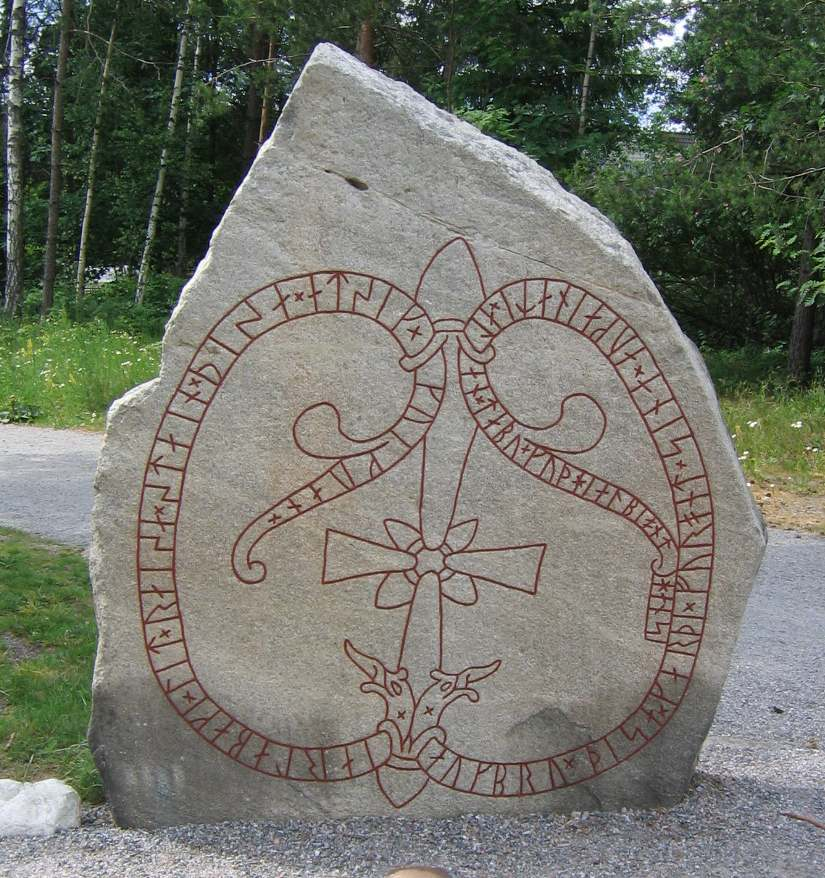
The runestone U 164

This runestone in the style Pr2-Pr3 (mid-11th century) is located at the causeway known as Jarlabanke's bridge. It is another one of the rune stones that he raised in memory of himself while he was alive, and where he declares that he commands all of Täby. It tells that it is specifically made to commemorate the creation of the causeway ("bridge") for the sake of Jarlabanke's soul.

× iarlabaki × lit × raisa × stain × þisa × at sik × kuikuan ×× auk bru × þisa × karþi × fur ont × sina × auk ain ati × alan × tabu × kuþ hialbi ont hans
{} Iarlabanki {} let {} ræisa {} stæina {} þessa {} at sik {} kvikvan, {} ok bro {} þessa {} gærði {} fyr and {} sina, {} ok æinn atti {} allan {} Tæby. {} Guð hialpi and hans.
Jarlabanki had these stones raised in memory of himself while alive, and made this bridge for his spirit, and (he) alone owned all of Tábýr. May God help his spirit.

=== U 165 ===
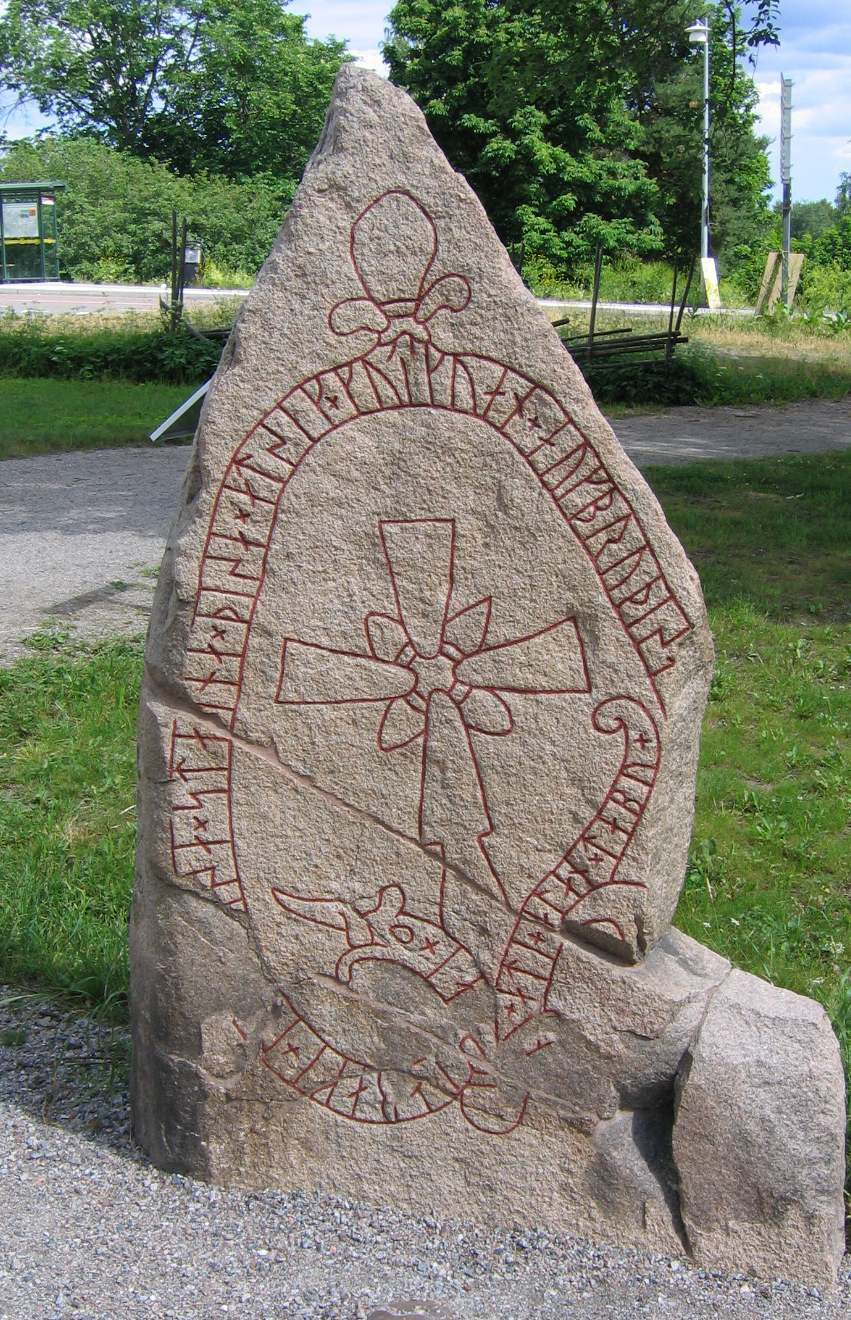
The runestone U 165

Like the previous rune stone, this one is also located at the causeway Jarlabanke's bridge. It contains the same message and informs that Jarlabanke made the causeway for his soul and raised the stone in memory of himself. It also adds that Jarlabanke was in command of all of Täby. It is in style Pr2 (second half of the 11th century).

ia[r]labaki × li- ---sa × staina × þisa × at sik × kuikuan × auk bru þis(a) [× karþi fur ont ×] si-- --- × ati + (a)lan × tabu +
Iarlabanki {} le[t ræi]sa {} stæina {} þessa {} at sik {} kvikvan, {} ok bro þessa {} gærði fyr and {} si[na ...] {} atti {} allan {} Tæby. {}
Jarlabanki had these stones raised in memory of himself while alive and made this bridge for his spirit ... owned all of Tábýr.

=== U 212 ===
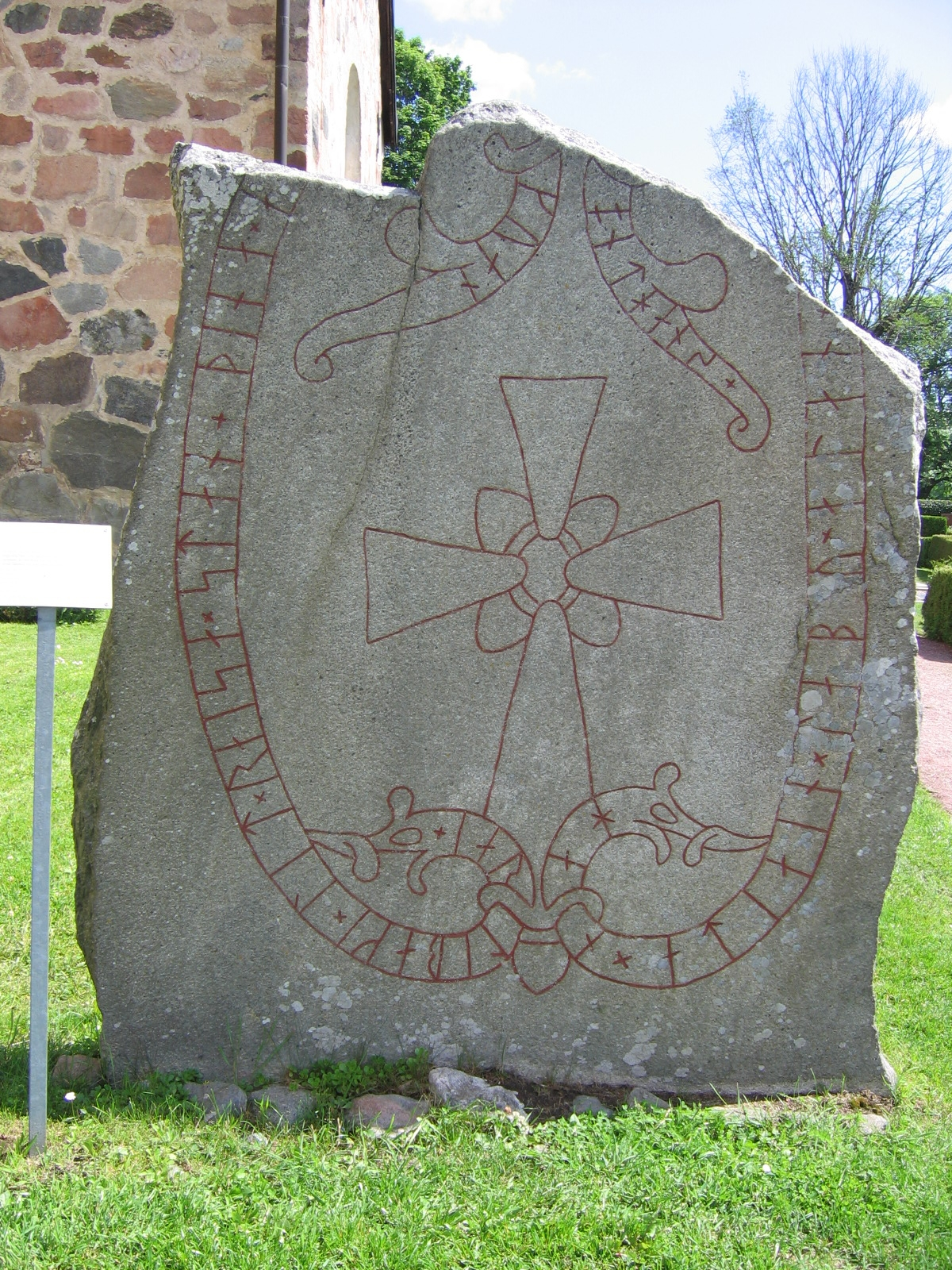
Side A of U 212

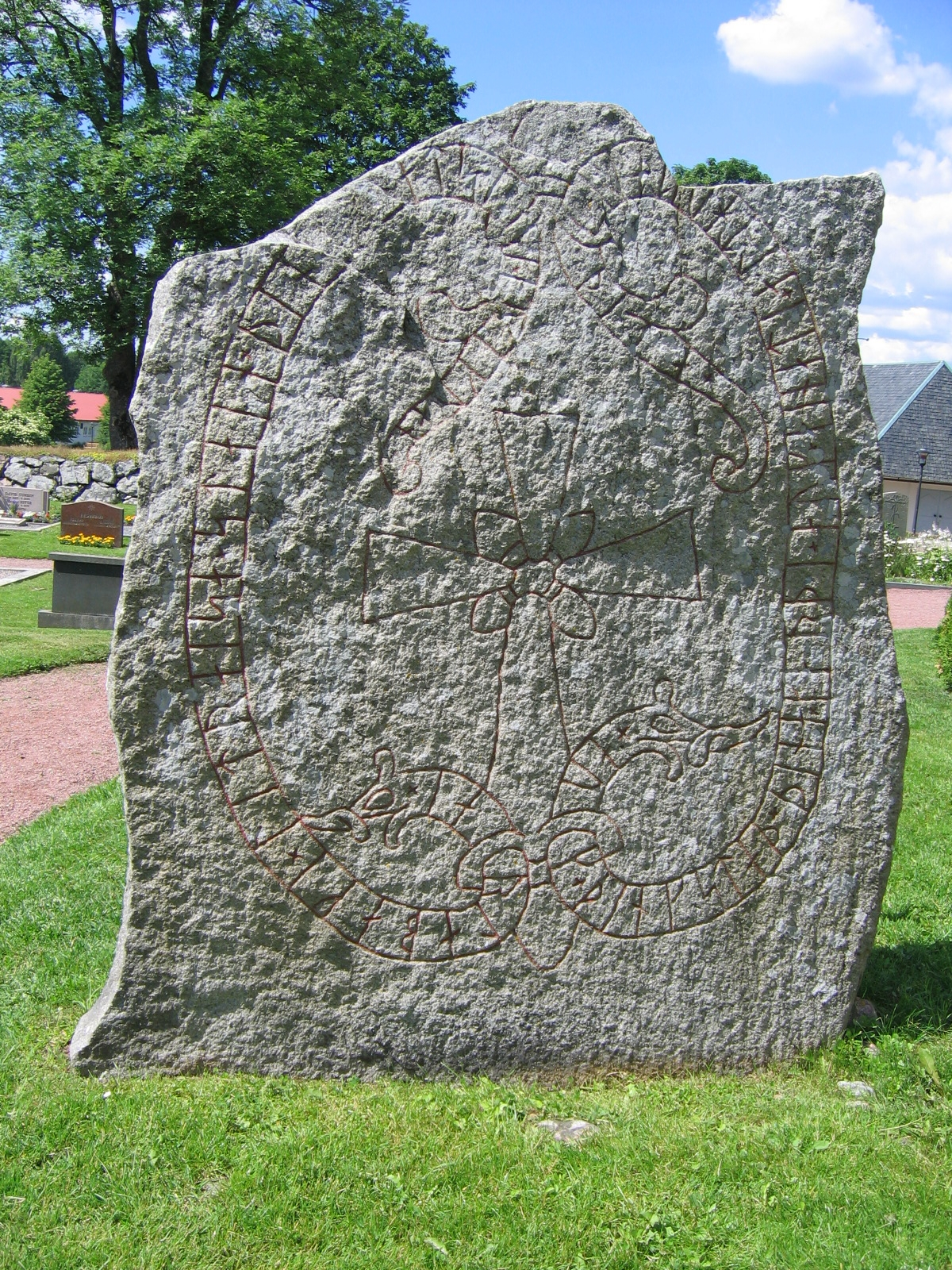
Side B of U 212

This runestone is located at the church of Vallentuna, but it is not known where its original location was. A notable aspect of the stone is the fact that it is engraved on both sides (A and B) and that the small difference between the messages is of note. On side A, he is in possession of all of Täby and here the Old Norse verb eiga can be interpreted as "to own", but on side B, he was in possession of the whole hundred. In the last sense, the verb eiga probably means "to command". The latter side also informs that the rune stone was raised where he had made the assembly location of the hundred. Side B is later than side A and it was probably made after a piece of the stone had been destroyed, as is suggested by its design. Jarlabanke's power had been extended from the village of Täby to the whole hundred. Side A is in the style Pr2 (first half of the 11th century) and side B is in the style Pr2-Pr3 (mid-11th century).

× iarlibaki × lit × raisa × stan + þina × a... ... ...kuan + han × ati ain × tabu × alan × -... ... ont hans +
{} Iarlabanki {} let {} ræisa {} stæin {} þenna {} a[t sik kvi]kvan. {} Hann {} atti æinn {} Tæby {} allan. {} [Guð hialpi] and hans. {}
Jarlabanki had this stone raised in memory of himself while alive. He alone owned all of Tábýr. May God help his spirit.

× iarlabaki × lit raisa × stain × þin- at sik kuikuan × auk × þinkstaþ × þina × karþi + auk × ain ati + alt hu-(t)ari × þita +
{} Iarlabanki {} let ræisa {} stæin {} þenn[a] at sik kvikvan, {} ok {} þingstað {} þenna {} gærði, {} ok {} æinn atti {} allt hu[n]dari {} þetta. {}
Jarlabanki had this stone raised in memory of himself while alive and made this Assembly-place, and alone owned all of this Hundred.

=== U 216 ===
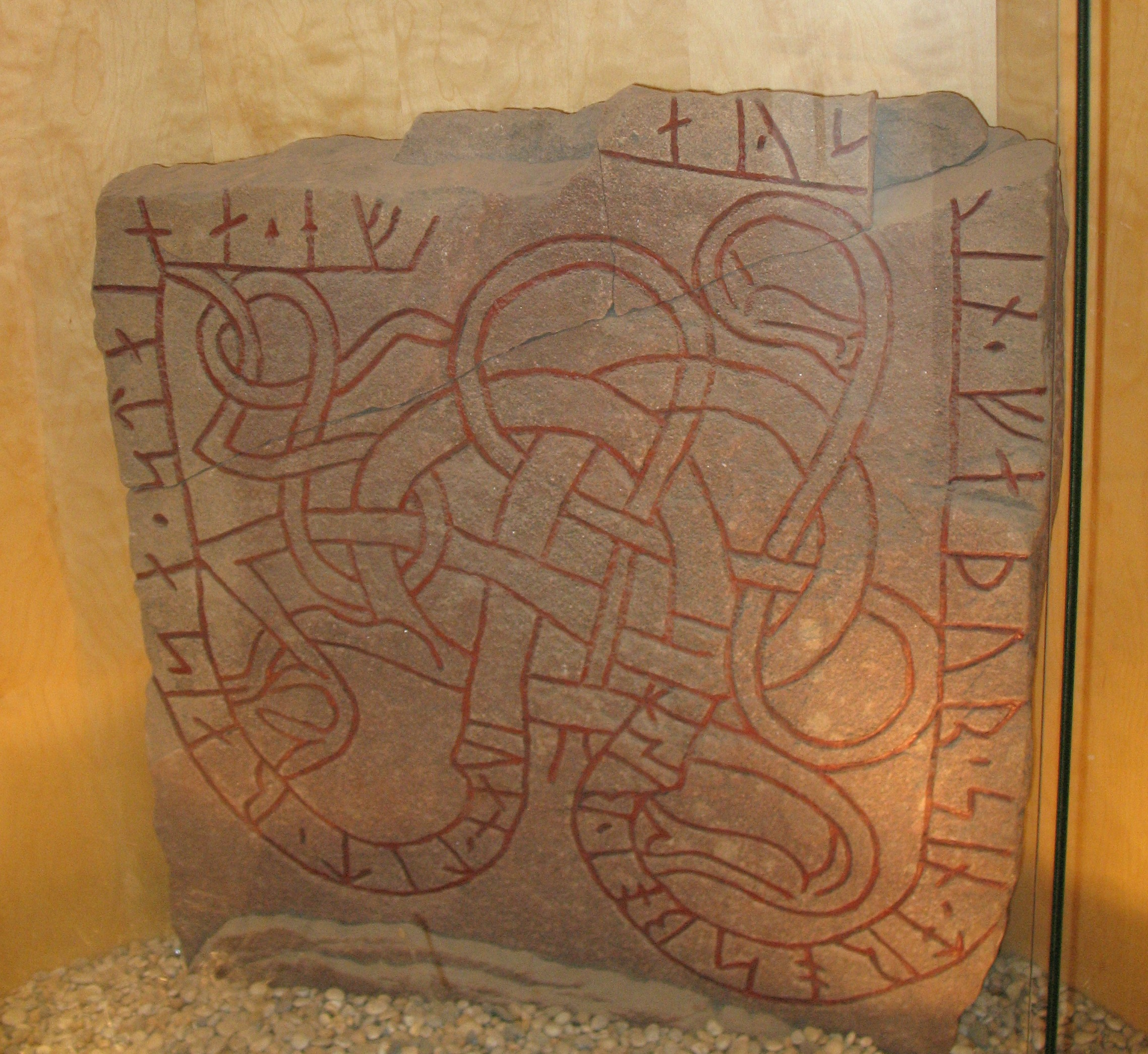
The runestone U 216

This runestone was found at the church of Vallentuna, but it is presently stored inside the community pharmacy of Vallentuna. It is raised by a man having a Christian name, Johan, in memory of his father Eysteinn. This Eysteinn is believed to be the son of Jarlabanke's son Ingifastr. It is in the style Pr5 (late 11th or early 12th century).

iuan ÷ lit ÷ raisa ' staina + ef... ' ay(s)-(a)in + faþur ' sin ÷ drosboi ÷ risti
Ioan {} let {} ræisa {} stæina {} æf[tiʀ] {} Øys[t]æin, {} faður {} sinn. {} Drosboi {} risti.
Jóhan had the stones raised in memory of Eysteinn, his father. Drósbúi carved.

=== U 217 ===
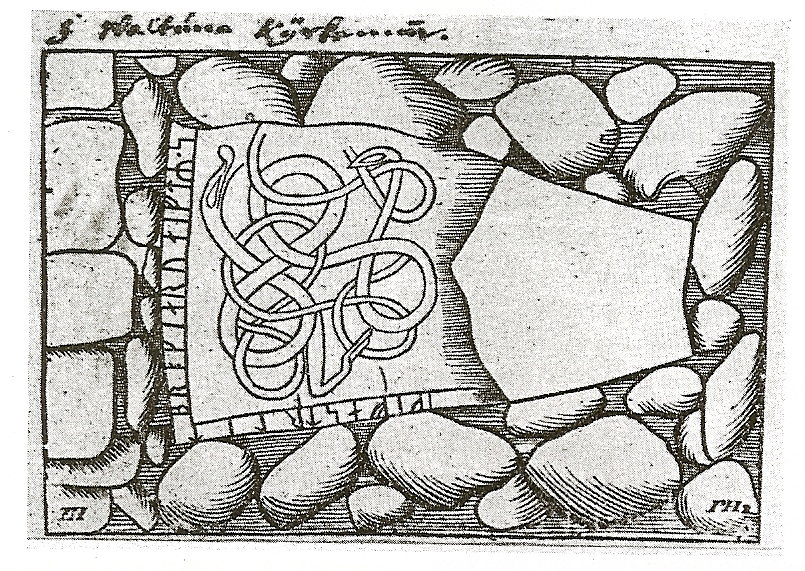
Runestone U 217 in a 17th-century drawing

This runestone was found in the church of Vallentuna, but it has disappeared. It was raised to commemorate that an Ingifastr had made a bridge, and this Ingifastr is held to be Jarlabanke's son, and the father of the Eysteinn mentioned on the previous rune stone. The reason for connecting the people mentioned on these stones is their location and the fact that U 216 and U 217 were both carved by the runemaster Drósbúi.

ikifastr lit bro kiarua iftʀ * s...
Ingifastr let bro gærva æftiʀ {} ...
Ingifastr had the bridge made in memory of ...

=== U 261 ===
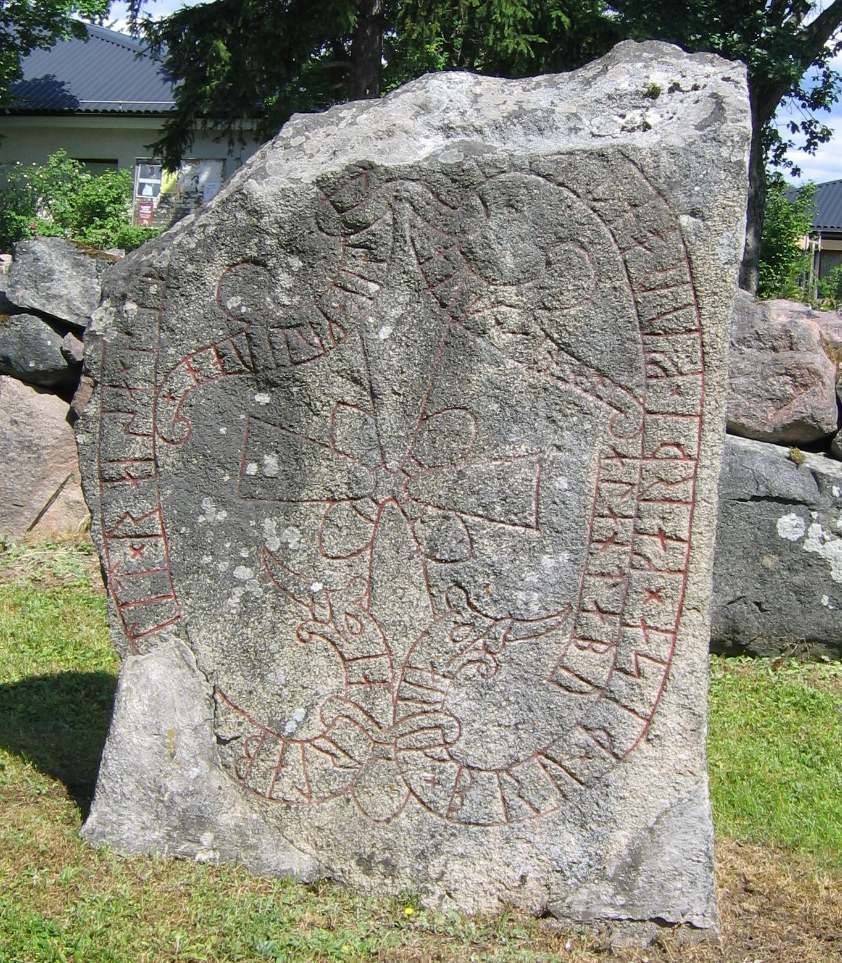
The runestone U 261 at Fresta Church

This runestone is located at the church of Fresta, and it is possibly in the style Pr2-Pr3 (mid-11th century). It is an additional rune stone raised by Jarlabanke is memory of himself, while he was alive, and that mentions that he was the sole owner of Täby.

iarlaba... lit × raisa × s[taina × þasa × a]t sik × kuikuan × ¶ auk × bru × þisa × karþi × fur ont [×] s[in]a × auk × ain ati alan tabu
Iarlaba[nki] let {} ræisa {} stæina {} þessa {} at sik {} kvikvan, {} {} ok {} bro {} þessa {} gærði {} fyr and {} sina, {} ok {} æinn atti allan Tæby.
Jarlabanki had these stones raised in memory of himself while alive and made this bridge for his spirit, and (he) alone owned all of Tábýr.

== See also ==
- List of runestones

== Sources and external links ==
- Hadenius, Stig; Nilsson, Torbjörn & Åselius, Gunnar. (1996). Sveriges historia. Centraltryckeriet, Borås. ISBN 91-34-51857-6
- Pritsak, Omeljan. (1981). The origin of Rus'. Cambridge, Mass.: Distributed by Harvard University Press for the Harvard Ukrainian Research Institute. ISBN 0-674-64465-4
- Nationalencyklopedin
- Rundata
- An English Dictionary of Runic Inscriptions of the Younger Futhark, at the university of Nottingham
- An Internet site on the Jarlabanke clan.
- A presentation at the Foteviken Museum.
- A presentation at the National Historic Museum, in Sweden.
