= Uppland Runic Inscription Fv1986 84 =

Coordinates: 59.374037°N 18.161526°E

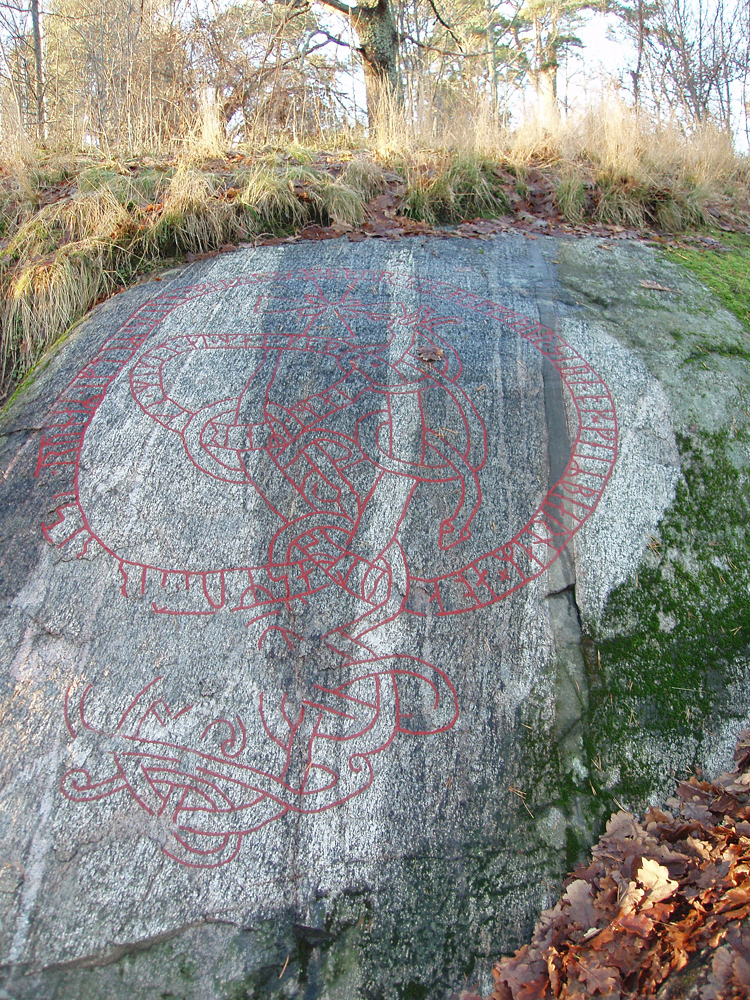
- Created: eleventh century
- Discovered: Bo gård, Lidingö, Uppland, Sweden
- Rundata ID: U Fv1986;84
- Runemaster: Åsmund (Asmutr)

Text – Native
- Old Norse: Ásmu[n]dr ris[ti] rúnar eptir Stein, fǫðurfǫður sinn, ok fǫður Sibba ok Geirbjarnar ok Ulfs. Hér merki mikit at mann góðan.

Translation
- Ásmundr carved the runes in memory of Steinn, his father's father, and the father of Sibbi and Geirbjǫrn and Ulfr. Here (stands) a great landmark in memory of a good man.

Runic inscription U Fv1986;84 is the Rundata catalog number for a Viking Age memorial that is located at Bo gård on the island of Lidingö in Uppland, Sweden.

== Description ==
This runestone was discovered in 1984 and is carved on a boulder located on the island of Lidingö. The inscription, which is about 2 meters high by 1.4 meters wide, consists of runic text carved on an intertwined serpent. There is a Christian cross near the top of the design. The inscription is classified as being carved in runestone style Pr3 - Pr4, which is also known as the Urnes style. This runestone style is characterized by slim and stylized animals that are interwoven into tight patterns. The animal heads are typically seen in profile with slender almond-shaped eyes and upwardly curled appendages on the noses and the necks.

The runic text begins at the bottom of the inscription and reads clockwise along the serpent. The text states that the runemaster Åsmund carved the runes in memory of his grandfather Steinn. Åsmund is known to have been active in the Uppland area in the first half of the 11th century. Other surviving runestones that are listed in Rundata as being signed by Åsmund include U 301 in Skånela, the now-lost U 346 in Frösunda, U 356 in Ängby, the now-lost U 368 in Helgåby, U 824 in Holm, U 847 in Västeråker, U 859 in Måsta, U 871 in Ölsta, U 884 in Ingla, U 932 at Uppsala Cathedral, U 956 in Vedyxa, U 969 in Bolsta, the now-lost U 986 in Kungsgården, U 998 in Skällerö, U 1142 in Åbyggeby, U 1144 in Tierp, U 1149 in Fleräng, U Fv1988;241 in Rosersberg, Gs 11 in Järvsta, Gs 12 in Lund, and Gs 13 in Söderby. The runic text also states that Steinn's sons were named Sibbi, Geirbjǫrn, and Ulfr, but which of these was the father of Åsmund is unknown.

The inscription is somewhat unusual in that it is a memorial to a grandfather. In all of Scandinavia, only nine runestones mention grandparents and the other eight runestones which do are in the area around Lake Mälaren.

The Rundata designation for this Uppland inscription, U Fv1986;84, refers to the year and page number of the issue of Fornvännen in which it was first described.

== Transliteration ==
A transliteration of the inscription is:

asmu-tr ... ris-- * runaʀ * eftiʀ × stein * faþurs*faþur * sin * auk * faþur * siba * ok × geiʀbiarnaʀ × aok ... ulfs * eaʀ * merki * mikit * at * man * koþan ×

== See also ==
- List of runestones
- Runic alphabet
