= Uppland Runic Inscription 1144 =

Coordinates: 60.2994°N 17.4698°E

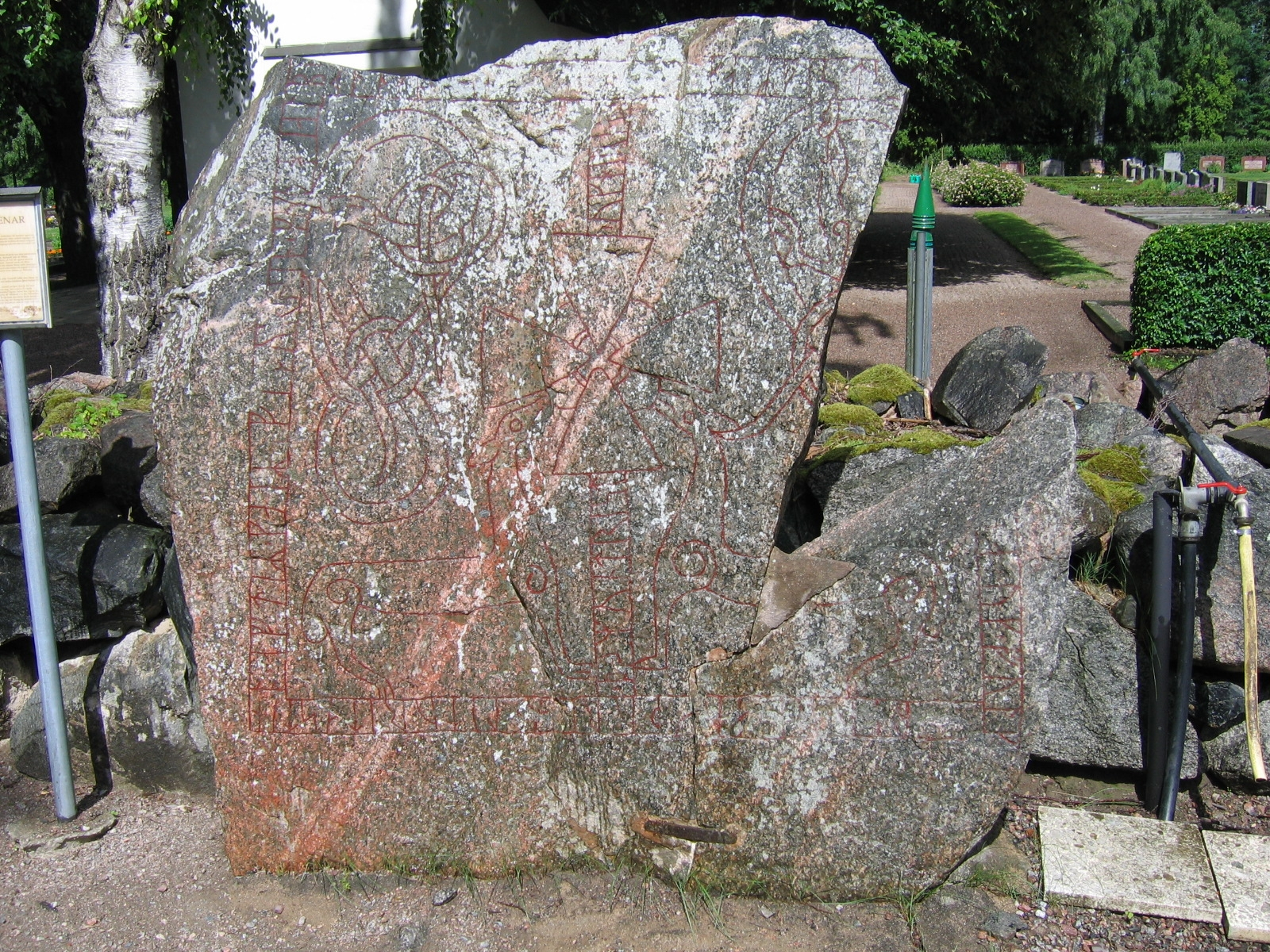
Runestone U 1144 is located in Tierp, Uppland, Sweden.

Uppland Runic Inscription 1144 or U 1144 is the Rundata catalog designation of a Viking Age memorial runestone in a churchyard that is located five kilometers southwest of Tierp, Uppsala County, Sweden, which was in the historic province of Uppland.

== Description ==
The runic inscription consists of runic text within bands that are around an unusual image of a Christian cross surrounded by stylized serpents and two lambs. It has been suggested that the runestone's iconography of an adoring lamb on each side of the cross may have been based on similar images seen during pilgrimages to Rome or the Holy Land. The stone is composed of granite and is 1.8 meters in height with the upper right portion missing. The inscription is classified as being carved in runestone style Pr3, which is also known as Urnes style. This runestone style is characterized by slim and stylized animals that are interwoven into tight patterns. The animal heads are typically seen in profile with slender almond-shaped eyes and upwardly curled appendages on the noses and the necks.

The runic text on runestone U 1144 states that the stone is a memorial raised by five brothers in memory of their father Geiri, and, consistent with the iconography, includes a prayer for his soul. The inscription is signed by two runemasters with the normalized names of Hæriarr and Åsmund Kåresson. Åsmund was a runemaster active in the Uppland region in the first half of the eleventh century and signed about twenty runic inscriptions, with another thirty stones attributed to him. Other surviving runestones that are signed by Åsmund include U 301 in Skånela, the now-lost U 346 in Frösunda, U 356 in Ängby, the now-lost U 368 in Helgåby, U 824 in Holm, U 847 in Västeråker, U 859 in Måsta, U 871 in Ölsta, U 884 in Ingla, U 932 at Uppsala Cathedral, U 956 in Vedyxa, U 969 in Bolsta, the now-lost U 986 in Kungsgården, U 998 in Skällerö, U 1142 in Åbyggeby, U 1149 in Fleräng, U Fv1986;84 in Bo gård, U Fv1988;241 in Rosersberg, Gs 11 in Järvsta, Gs 12 in Lund, and Gs 13 in Söderby. The signature of Hæriarr, however, is not on any other surviving runestone. When writing runic text, it was common to only carve a single rune for two consecutive letters, even when the letters were at the end of one word and the beginning of a second word. When the text is shown as Latin characters, the transliterated runes are doubled and separate words are shown. In the runemaster's signature, osmuntritsi, an additional r-rune, is added in the transliteration to form the words osmuntr| |ritsi ("Ásmundr carved"). Åsmund signed his name using the same runes on two other inscriptions, U 824 and U 1142.

== Inscription ==
=== Transliteration of the runes into Latin characters ===
' kaiʀfast(r) [auk hunifraʀ auk hrafn] ' auk ' fulkbiurn ' auk þuriʀ ' litu rita stino ' aftiʀ ' kaiʀ[a] f[a]þur sin ' kuþ hialbi (a)n- h(o)ns ' osmuntr| |risti ' uk hiriaʀ '

=== Transcription into Old Norse ===
Geirfastr ok Hónefr ok Hrafn ok Folkbjǫrn ok Þórir létu rétta steina eptir Geira, fôður sinn. Guð hjalpi ôn[d] hans. Ásmundr risti ok Herjarr(?).

=== Translation in English ===
Geirfastr and Hónefr and Hrafn and Folkbjǫrn and Þórir had the stones erected in memory of Geiri, their father. May God help his spirit. Ásmundr carved and Herjarr(?).

== See also ==
- List of runestones
