= Uppland Runic Inscription 1158 =

Viking Age runestone in Sweden

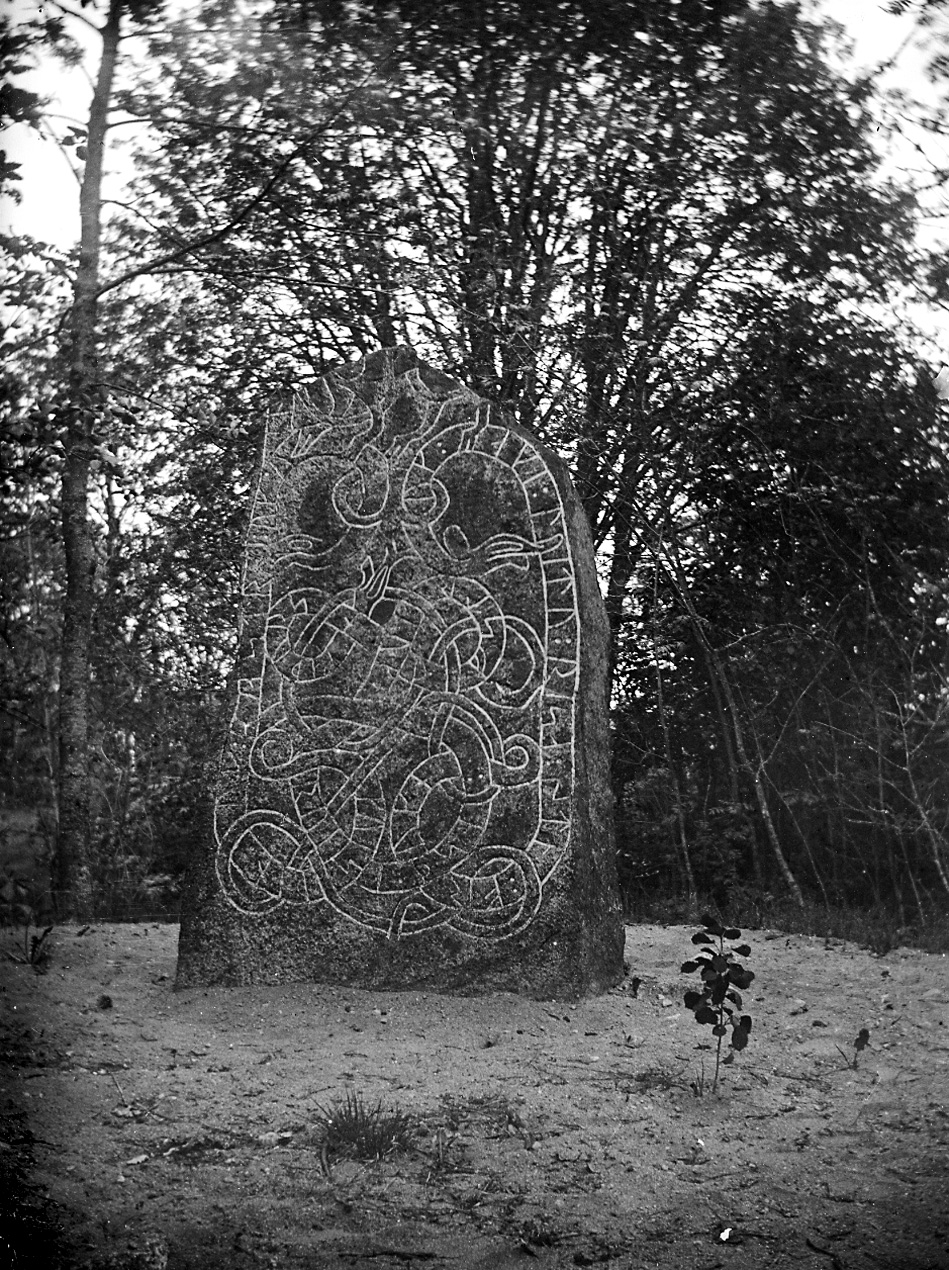
Photograph of U 1158 taken in 1919.

Uppland Runic Inscription 1158 or U 1158 is the Rundata catalogue listing for a Viking Age memorial runestone that is located at Stora Salfors, which is one kilometre east of Fjärdhundra, Uppsala County, Sweden, and is in the historic province of Uppland. The stone is a memorial to a man named Freygeirr, and may have been the same Freygeirr who was a Viking chieftain active on the Baltic coast in the 1050s.

== Description ==
The inscription on U 1158, which is on a granite stone that is 1.86 meters in height, consists of runic text in the younger futhark that is carved on three intertwined serpents. The top section of the runestone is missing. The inscription is classified as being carved in runestone style Pr3 or Pr4, both of which are also known as Urnes style. This runestone style is characterized by slim and stylized animals that are interwoven into tight patterns. The animal heads are typically seen in profile with slender almond-shaped eyes and upwardly curled appendages on the noses and the necks. The stone was noted in 1865 as being originally located in a circle of stones north of a crossroads, but was moved in 1884 to its current location at a farm at the request of a school teacher. The inscription is signed by a runemaster with the normalized name of Livsten. Livsten signed several other inscriptions, including U 766 and U 767 in Norrby, U 796 in Sparrsätra, U 1152 in Brunnby, U 1161 in Altuna, U 1164 in Stora Runhällen, and Vs 29 in Sala Landsförsamling.

The runic text, which is incomplete due to the missing top section of the stone, states that the runestone was raised by some brothers, three of whom were named Guðsteinn, Eistr, and Áki, in memory of their father Freygeirr. According to scholar Omeljan Pritsak, this is the same Freygeirr who led a leidang expedition on the Baltic coast. Five other runestones refer to this Freygeirr, including Gs 13 in Söderby, DR 216 in Tirsted, U 518 in Västa Ledinge, U 611 in Tibble, and U 698 in Veckholms. It has been noted that one of Freygeir's son was named Eistr meaning "man from Estonia" or "Estonian," which Pritsak connects to Freygeir's activities on the other side of the Baltic Sea.

== Inscription ==
=== Transliteration of the runes into Latin characters ===
: kuisþen : yg : estr : yg : uin... : yk : aki : litu : risa : stn : fryke : faþur se : lfsten : iuk : runi : þsa :

=== Transcription into Old Norse ===
Guðstæinn(?) ok Æistr ok ... ok Aki letu ræisa stæin [æftiʀ] Frøygæiʀ, faður sinn. Lifstæinn hiogg runaʀ þessa.

=== Translation in English ===
Guðsteinn(?) and Eistr and ... and Áki had the stone raised in memory of Freygeirr, their father. Lífsteinn cut these runes.

== See also ==
- List of runestones
