= Bolsta Runestones =

Viking Age memorial runestones

Coordinates: 59°52′17″N 17°41′52″E

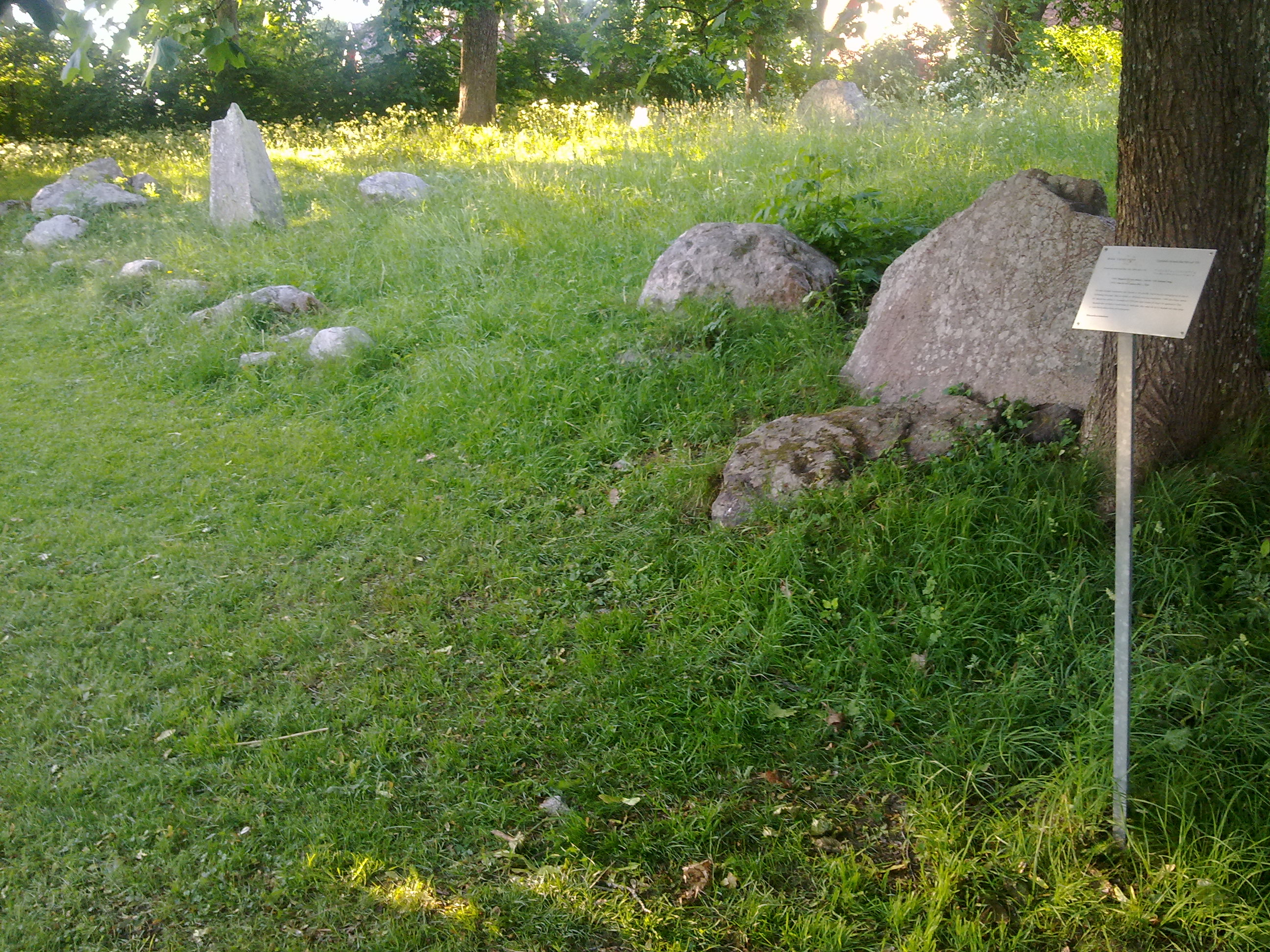
Runestones U 969 (at left) and U 970.

The Bolsta Runestones are two Viking Age memorial runestones and two fragments of a third that are located in Bolsta, which is on the east edge of Uppsala, Uppsala County, Sweden, and in the historic province of Uppland. One runestone is signed by the runemaster with the normalized name of Åsmund Kåresson and the other by the runemaster named Öpir.

== U 968 ==
Upplands Runic Inscription 968 or U 968 is the Rundata catalog listing for two fragments of a runestone that are 0.6 and 0.8 meters in height. The inscription consists of runic text carved in the younger futhark on a serpent. The inscription was recorded during the initial Swedish runestone surveys of the 1600s, but the stone later disappeared. Before the historic nature of runestones was understood, they were often reused as materials in the construction of churches, buildings, and walls. Two fragments of the stone were found in the basement of a village house in the 1880s, and are now located on private property. The inscription is classified as being carved in runestone style Pr4, which also known as Urnes style. This runestone style is characterized by slim and stylized animals that are interwoven into tight patterns. The animal heads are typically seen in profile with slender almond-shaped eyes and upwardly curled appendages on the noses and the necks.

The runic text is based upon the recorded text from the 1600s with sections that are today missing from the two fragments shown below within brackets. The test indicates that the stone was raised as a memorial by two brothers named Stóði and Sigdjarfr and their father Þorgerðr in memory of a brother named Eistulfr. The runic text leaves off a conjunction ok ("and") between two of the names of the sponsors, which has been added in the transcription into Old Norse below. It has been noted that the runemasters Öpir and Åsmund left off a conjunction between the name of sponsors on some twenty inscriptions in Uppland, but since there are some examples of other runemasters also leaving off conjunctions, this is not a sufficient basis for attribution of the carver of U 968.

=== Inscription ===
==== Transliteration of the runes into Latin characters ====
[stoþi * auk * sihtiarfr * þorker * lit]u * ris[t]a * stin at * aistu[lf * b]roþu[r *] (s)in [sun þorkerþa]

==== Transcription into Old Norse ====
Stoði ok Sigdiarfʀ [ok] Þorgærðr letu rista stæin at Æistulf, broður sinn, sun Þorgærðaʀ.

==== Translation in English ====
Stóði and Sigdjarfr and Þorgerðr had the stone carved in memory of Eistulfr, their brother, Þorgerðr's son.

== U 969 ==
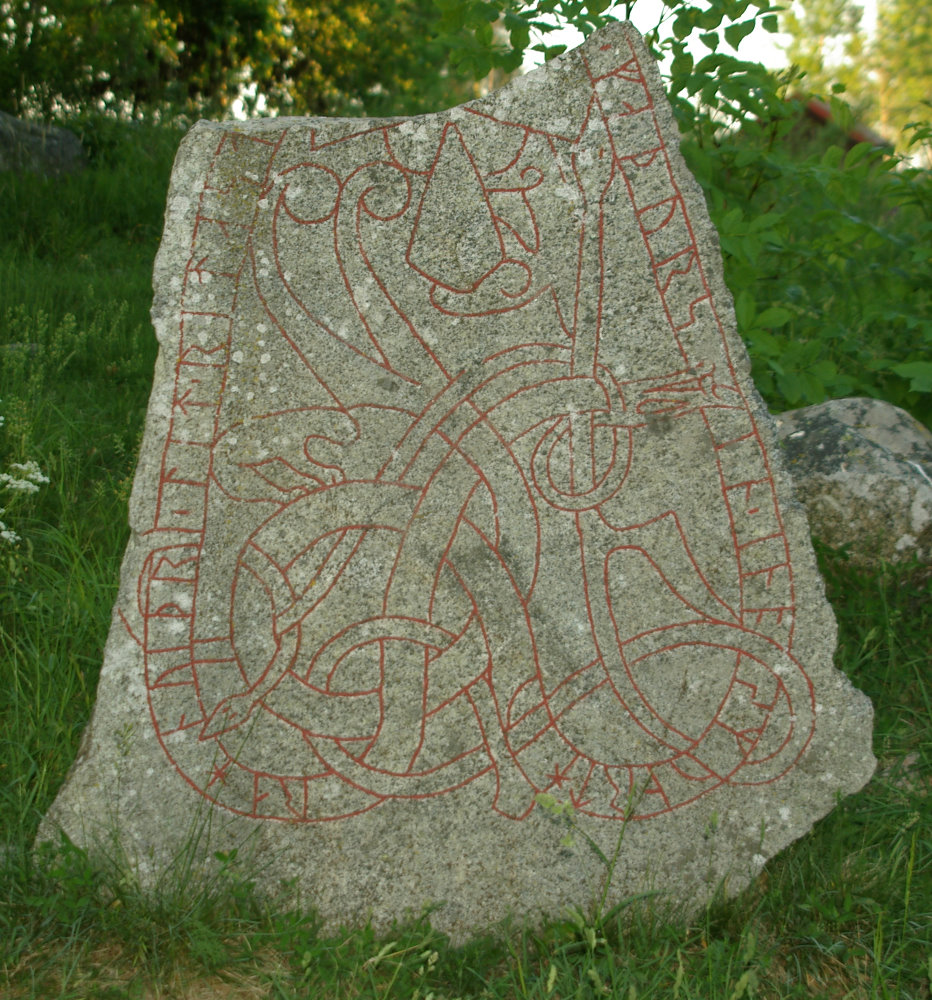
U 969 is signed by the runemaster Åsmund.

Upplands Runic Inscription 969 or U 969 is the Rundata listing for an inscription on a granite stone 1.35 meters in height. The inscription consists of runic text carved in the younger futhark on a serpent with a cross in the upper section. The inscription is classified as being carved in either runestone style Pr3 or Pr4, both of which are considered to be Urnes style. The runic text states that the stone was raised by a man named Ragnviðr in memory of his father, and that the inscription was carved by the runemaster Åsmund Kåresson. Åsmund was active in Uppland in the first half of the 11th century. Over twenty other inscriptions are listed in Rundata as being signed by Åsmund including U 301 in Skånela, the now-lost U 346 in Frösunda, U 356 in Ängby, the now-lost U 368 in Helgåby, U 824 in Holm, U 847 in Västeråker, U 859 in Måsta, U 871 in Ölsta, U 884 in Ingla, U 932 at Uppsala Cathedral, U 956 in Vedyxa, the now-lost U 986 in Kungsgården, U 998 in Skällerö, U 1142 in Åbyggeby, U 1144 in Tierp, U 1149 in Fleräng, U Fv1986;84 in Bo gård, U Fv1988;241 in Rosersberg, Gs 11 in Järvsta, Gs 12 in Lund, and Gs 13 in Söderby. In signing U 969, Åsmund shifted the r-rune one space over to spell his name as osmunrt. He also did this in the text on inscriptions U 859, U 986, U 998, U 1149, and Gs 13. Åsmund signed with the statement en Asmundr hio or "and Ásmundr cut," words that he also used on U 871.

=== Inscription ===
==== Transliteration of the runes into Latin characters ====
rahnuiþr ' lit ' rita st... ... ' faþur sin ' in osmunrt hiu

==== Transcription into Old Norse ====
Ragnviðr let retta st[æin] ... faður sinn. En Asmundr hio.

==== Translation in English ====
Ragnviðr had the stone erected ... his father. And Ásmundr cut.

== U 970 ==
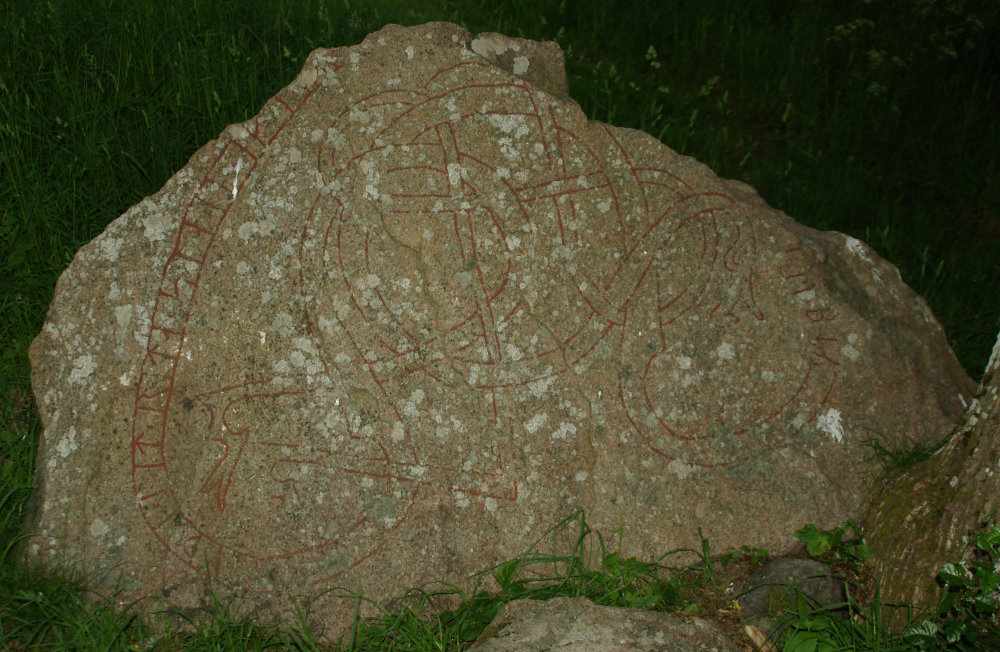
U 970 is signed by the runemaster Öpir.

Upplands Runic Inscription 970 or U 970 is the Rundata listing for an inscription carved on a granite stone that is 1.15 meters in height. The inscription consists of runic text carved in the younger futhark on a serpent. The stone has been damaged such that a portion of the inscription and text is missing. The inscription is classified as being carved in runestone style Pr5, which is considered to be Urnes style. The runic text indicates that the stone was raised by a man named Viði or Víði, but the name of the person to whom the stone is a memorial has been lost. The text ends with the signature of Öpir, who was active in Uppland during the late 11th and early 12th centuries. His signature is on about fifty surviving runestones, and an additional fifty inscriptions have been attributed him.

=== Inscription ===
==== Transliteration of the runes into Latin characters ====
uiþi ' lit ' rita ' stain ' e(f)[ti]ʀ ...- ybiʀ

==== Transcription into Old Norse ====
Viði let retta stæin æftiʀ ... Øpiʀ.

==== Translation in English ====
Viði/Víði had the stone erected in memory of ... Œpir.

== See also ==
- List of runestones
