= Uppland Runic Inscription 871 =

12th-century runestone in Sweden

- Created: 11th century
- Discovered: Originally Ölsta; currently located at Skansen, Stockholm, Uppland, Sweden
- Rundata ID: U 871
- Runemaster: Åsmund Kåresson

U 871 is a 12th-century runestone in the Rundata catalog, originally from Ölsta, a village in the county of Uppland in Sweden. It is now on display at Skansen, near Stockholm.

== Description ==
It is believed that this stone remained in its original place until 1896. The spot was close to the Eriksgata, the road that the Swedish king travelled after having been elected at the Stone of Mora, in order to be accepted by his subjects. The stone was sold for 50 Swedish kronor in 1896 to the founder of Skansen, Artur Hazelius, where it was moved. It remains at Skansen to this day.

The inscription is classified as being carved in runestone style Pr4, which is also known as the Urnes style. This runestone style is characterized by slim and stylized lindworms that are interwoven into tight patterns. The animal heads are typically seen in profile with slender, almond-shaped eyes and upwardly curled appendages on the noses and the necks. The inscription is signed by the runemaster Åsmund Kåresson, who was active during the first half of the 11th century in Uppland. Over twenty other inscriptions are listed in Rundata as being signed by Åsmund including U 301 in Skånela, the now-lost U 346 in Frösunda, U 356 in Ängby, the now-lost U 368 in Helgåby, U 824 in Holm, U 847 in Västeråker, U 859 in Måsta, U 884 in Ingla, U 932 at Uppsala Cathedral, U 956 in Vedyxa, U 969 in Bolsta, the now-lost U 986 in Kungsgården, U 998 in Skällerö, U 1142 in Åbyggeby, U 1144 in Tierp, U 1149 in Fleräng, U Fv1986;84 in Bo gård, U Fv1988;241 in Rosersberg, Gs 11 in Järvsta, Gs 12 in Lund, and Gs 13 in Söderby. Åsmund signed with the statement en Asmundr hio or "and Ásmundr cut", words that he also used on U 969.

In 1991, the Swedish Rune Authority had the stone colorized as an experiment to see how well it would protect the stone from moss and the weather. It is believed that the colorization will protect this stone for at least 50 years to come.

== Inscription ==
The first line is a Latin transliteration; the second is Old West Norse normalization; the third is Runic Swedish.

binrn ' auþulfr ' (k)unor ' hulmtis ' ---u ri-o stin þino ' iftiʀ ' ulf ' kinlauhaʀ buanta ' in osmuntr hiu
Bjǫrn, {} Auðulfr, {} Gunnarr, {} Holmdís {} [lét]u ré[tt]a stein þenna {} eptir {} Ulf, {} Ginnlaugar bónda. {} En Ásmundr hjó.
Biorn, {} Auðulfʀ, {} Gunnarr, {} Holmdis {} [let]u re[tt]a stæin þenna {} æftiʀ {} Ulf, {} Ginnlaugaʀ boanda. {} En Asmundr hio.
Bjǫrn, Auðulfr, Gunnarr (and) Holmdís had this stone erected in memory of Ulfr, Ginnlaug's husbandman. And Ásmundr cut.

== Gallery ==
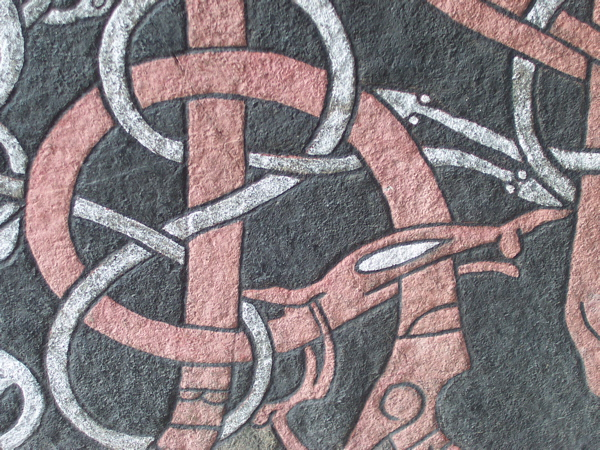
Detail from the U 871 runestone.

== See also ==
- List of runestones
