= Åsmund Kåresson =

11th-century Viking runemaster

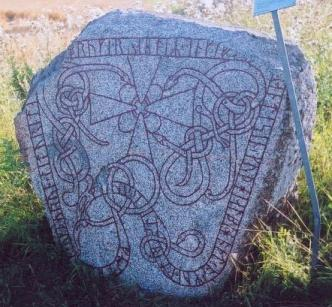
Inscription U 859 is signed by Åsmund.

Åsmund Kåresson was a Viking Age runemaster who flourished during the first half of the 11th century in Uppland and Gästrikland, Sweden. The early Urnes style is represented in his art.

== Work ==
Most early medieval Scandinavians were likely literate in runes, and most people carved messages on pieces of bone and wood. However, it was difficult to make runestones, and in order to master it, one also needed to be a stonemason. During the 11th century, when most runestones were raised, there were a few professional runemasters. Kåresson was active primarily in Uppland, and approximately twenty runestones are signed by him while an additional thirty stones have been attributed to him. The ornamentation is characterized by variation with firmness and security in the composition. Kåresson is the inventor of the classic Uppland runestone style with one or two animals (rundjur) showing their heads in profile.

One inscription that was found at Bo gård on the island of Lidingö, listed in Rundata as U Fv1986;84, is signed by Kåresson and dedicated to his grandfather named Steinn. The stone's runic text also states that Steinn's sons were named Sibbi, Geirbjôrn, and Ulfr, but it is not known if one of these was the father of Åsmund. In addition, in two inscriptions, U 956 in Vedyxa and Gs 11 in Järvsta, Åsmund Kåresson listed his patronym with the text osmuntr kara sun or "Ásmundr Kári's son."

It has been suggested that Kåresson was identical with the English clergyman Osmundus who became bishop at the court of king Emund the Old, but the reasons for this identification are not deemed sufficient.

== Inscriptions ==
Over twenty inscriptions are listed in the Rundata catalog as being signed by Åsmund including:

- U 301 in Skånela
- U 346 in Frösunda
- U 356 in Ängby
- U 368 in Helgåby
- U 824 in Holm
- U 847 in Västeråker
- U 859 in Måsta
- U 871 in Ölsta
- U 884 in Ingla
- U 932 at Uppsala Cathedral
- U 956 in Vedyxa
- U 969 in Bolsta
- U 986 in Kungsgården
- U 998 in Skällerö
- U 1142 in Åbyggeby
- U 1144 in Tierp
- U 1149 in Fleräng
- U Fv1986;84 in Bo gård
- U Fv1988;241 in Rosersberg
- Gs 11 in Järvsta
- Gs 12 in Lund
- Gs 13 in Söderby

On inscriptions U 859, U 986, U 969, U 998, U 1149, and Gs 13, Åsmund Kåresson shifted the r-rune over one space to spell his name as osmunrt.

== Gallery ==
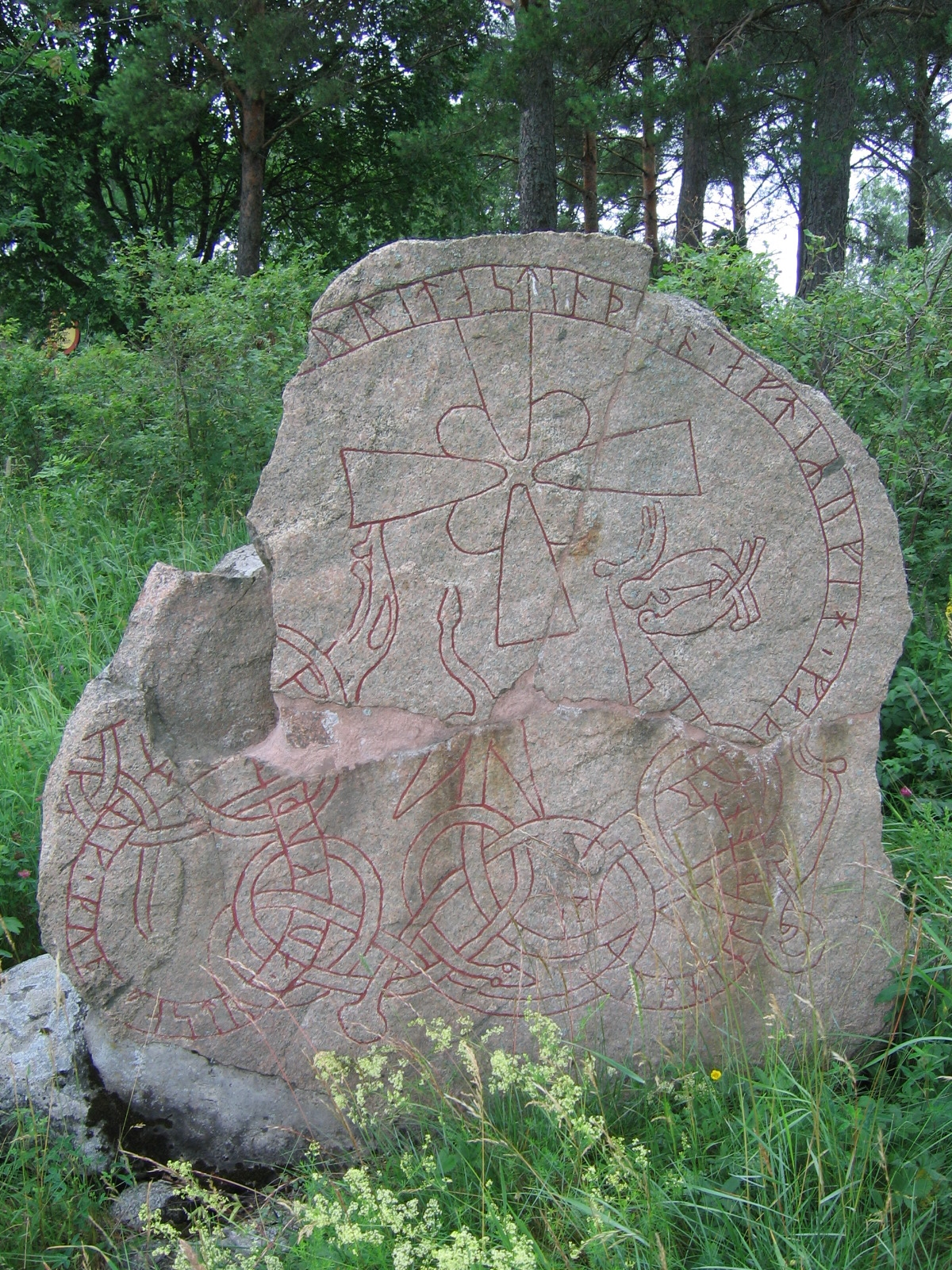
U 1043, a stone with a love scene attributed to Åsmund.

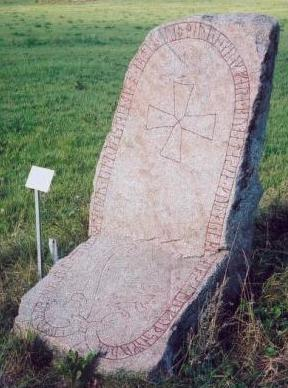
U 956, a stone at Vedyxa is signed by Åsmund.

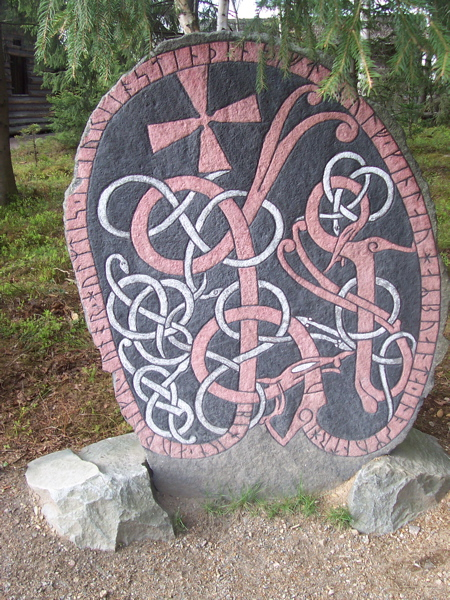
U 871, presently in Skansen, is signed by Åsmund.

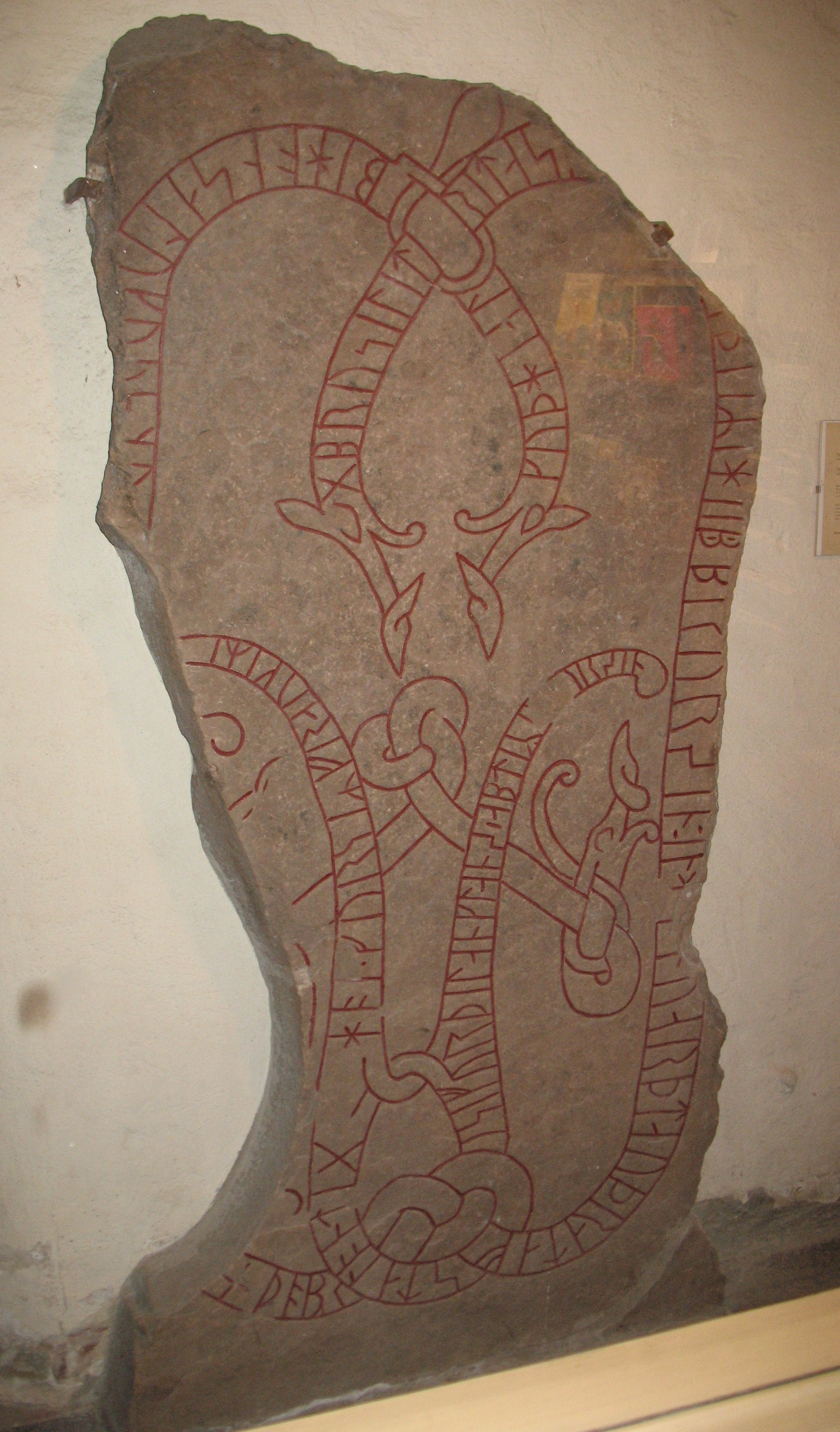
Gs 13, presently in Gävle, is signed by Åsmund.

== Sources ==
- The article Åsmund in Nationalencyklopedin (1996).
