= Uppland Runic Inscription 1043 =

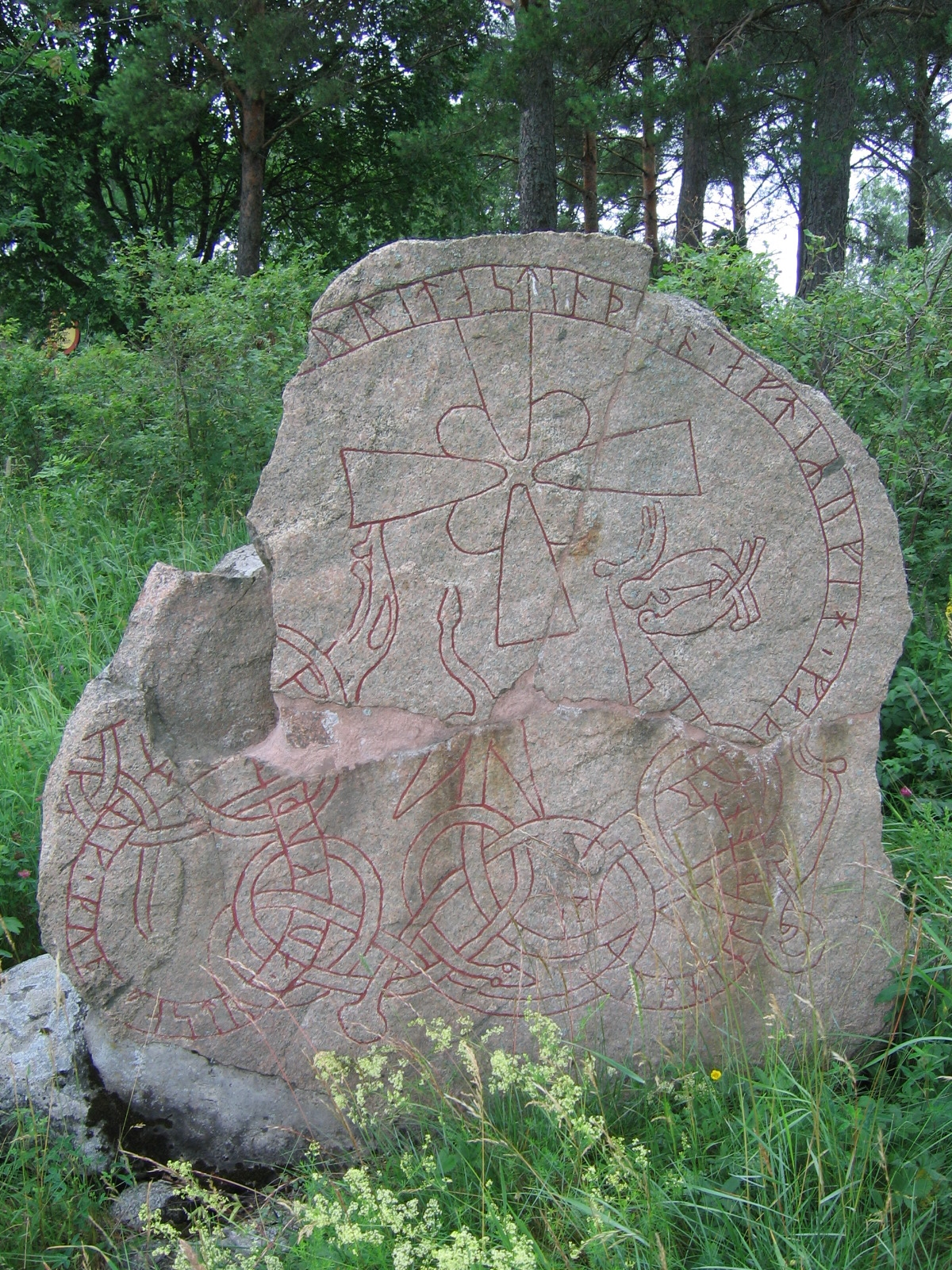
U 1043 is memorial runestone located in Onslunda, Tensta parish, Uppland, Sweden.

U 1043 is the Rundata designation for a runic inscription on a memorial runestone located in Onslunda, Tensta parish, and about four kilometers west of Vattholma, Sweden, which was in the historic province of Uppland. While the tradition of carving inscriptions into boulders began in the 4th century and lasted into the 12th century, most runestones date from the late Viking Age.

== Description ==
The runic inscription consists of a runic text carved on a serpent that twists around the edge of the stone and circles a Christian cross. The stone is granite and is 1.6 meters in height. Red paint fragments have been found in the inscription, supporting the theory that many runestones had inscriptions that were also painted. The runic text indicates that it is a memorial by three sons to their father. Consistent with the cross in the design, the text ends in a prayer for the father's soul.

Of the personal names in the runic text, the father's name Ófeigr combines the negative prefix ó with feigr, which means "death bound" or "fated to die" without any negative connotations intended. The father's name could thus mean "not fated to die," which would also be consistent with this runestone identification as a Christian memorial erected in the decades following the Christianization of this part of Sweden.

This runestone has been attributed to the runemaster Åsmund Kåresson on stylistic grounds. Åsmund was active in the first half of the eleventh century. The inscription is carved in runestone style Pr3 - Pr4, which is also known as the Urnes style. This runestone style is characterized by slim and stylized animals that are interwoven into tight patterns. The animal heads are typically seen in profile with slender almond-shaped eyes and upwardly curled appendages on the noses and the necks. The runestone also includes a stylized depiction of a couple engaged in sexual intercourse. It has been suggested that the couple does not appear to be part of the original design on this stone and that such a depiction is atypical for this period and region. No other depictions of actual intercourse are known to exist from the Viking Age.

== Inscription ==
=== Transliteration of the runes into Latin characters ===
u[lfr *] auk ' kuþfastr ' auk| |kuþ[muntr ' þ-... ...it]u rita stin þino ' aftiʀ ufih ' fa[þ]ur s(i)n ' kuþ hinlbi ont (h)-ns

=== Transcription into Old Norse ===
Ulfr ok Guðfastr ok Guðmundr þ[eir l]étu rétta stein þenna eptir Ófeig, fôður sinn. Guð hjalpi ônd h[a]ns.

=== Translation in English ===
Ulfr and Guðfastr and Guðmundr, they had this stone erected in memory of Ófeigr, their father. May God help his spirit.

== See also ==
- List of runestones
