= Lidingö SK =

Swedish sports club

- Full name: Lidingö sportklubb
- Sport: handball, volleyball soccer
- Founded: 1933
- Based in: Lidingö, Sweden
- Arena: Gångsätrahallen

Lidingö SK is a sports club in Lidingö, Sweden. The men's volleyball team won the Swedish national championships 18 times between 1966 and 1981. before winning again in 1987 and 1990.

The men's junior volleyball team won the Swedish national championship for four times in a row between 1975 and 1978.
