= Lidingö =

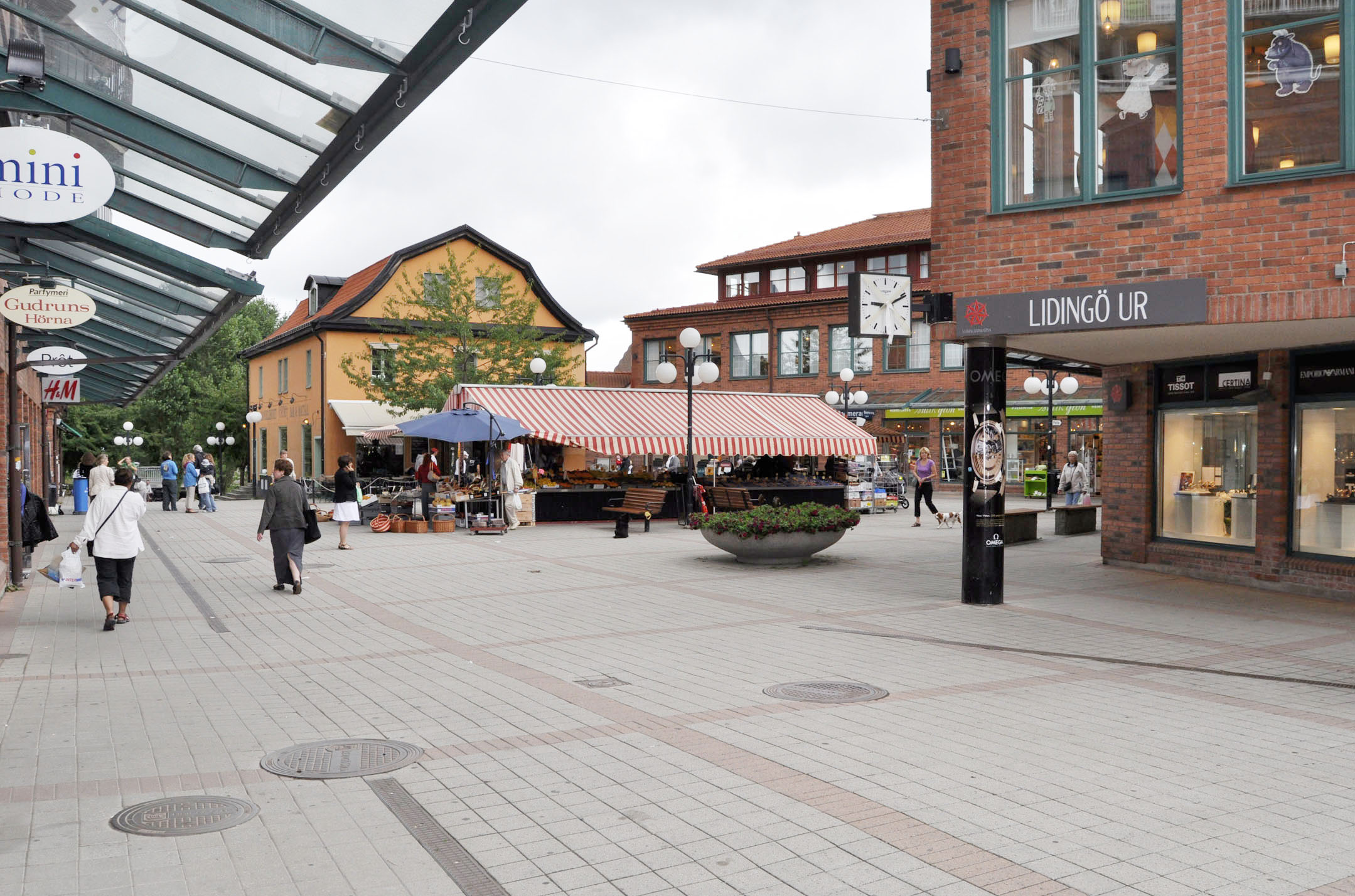
- Lidingö center

- Location within Stockholm Location within Sweden Location within European Union
- Coordinates: 59°22′N 18°09′E
- Country: Sweden
- Province: Uppland
- County: Stockholm County
- Municipality: Lidingö Municipality

Area
  - Total: 12.51 km^{2} (4.83 sq mi)

Population (31 December 2020)
  - Total: 43,925
  - Density: 3,511/km^{2} (9,094/sq mi)
- Time zone: UTC+1 (CET)
  - Summer (DST): UTC+2 (CEST)

Lidingö (Swedish pronunciation: [ˈlîːdɪŋˌøː]), also known in its definite form Lidingön and as Lidingölandet, is an island in the inner Stockholm archipelago, northeast of Stockholm, Sweden. In 2023, the population of the Lidingö urban area on the island was 48,162. It is the seat of government of the Lidingö Municipality, Stockholm County.

Lidingö's qualities have attracted affluent residents such as Björn Ulvaeus, Agnetha Fältskog, Anni-Frid Lyngstad and Benny Andersson of ABBA. Exclusive regions include the coastal region between Mölna and the east tip of the island, Gåshaga, as well as the east tip of the northern part of the horse shoe, called Elfvik. Notwithstanding the fact that many middle-class Swedes have moved to the island, (due to rental apartment construction projects), the inhabitants of the municipality remains the third wealthiest in Sweden after Danderyd and Täby.

== History ==
=== Runic inscriptions ===
Two runic inscriptions have been found on Lidingö. The latest, listed in Rundata as the Uppland Runic Inscription Fv1986 84, was found in 1984 under a 10 cm thick layer of soil and moss in an uninhabited region. The inscription is from the Viking Age, around 800–1050 AD. The inscription has been translated as:

"Åsmund carved runes in memory of his grandfather Sten, father of Sibbe and Gerbjörn...a great monument over a good man."

The figures show large snakes and on top, a Maltese cross, a typical motif for the late Viking Age rune stones.

=== Later history ===
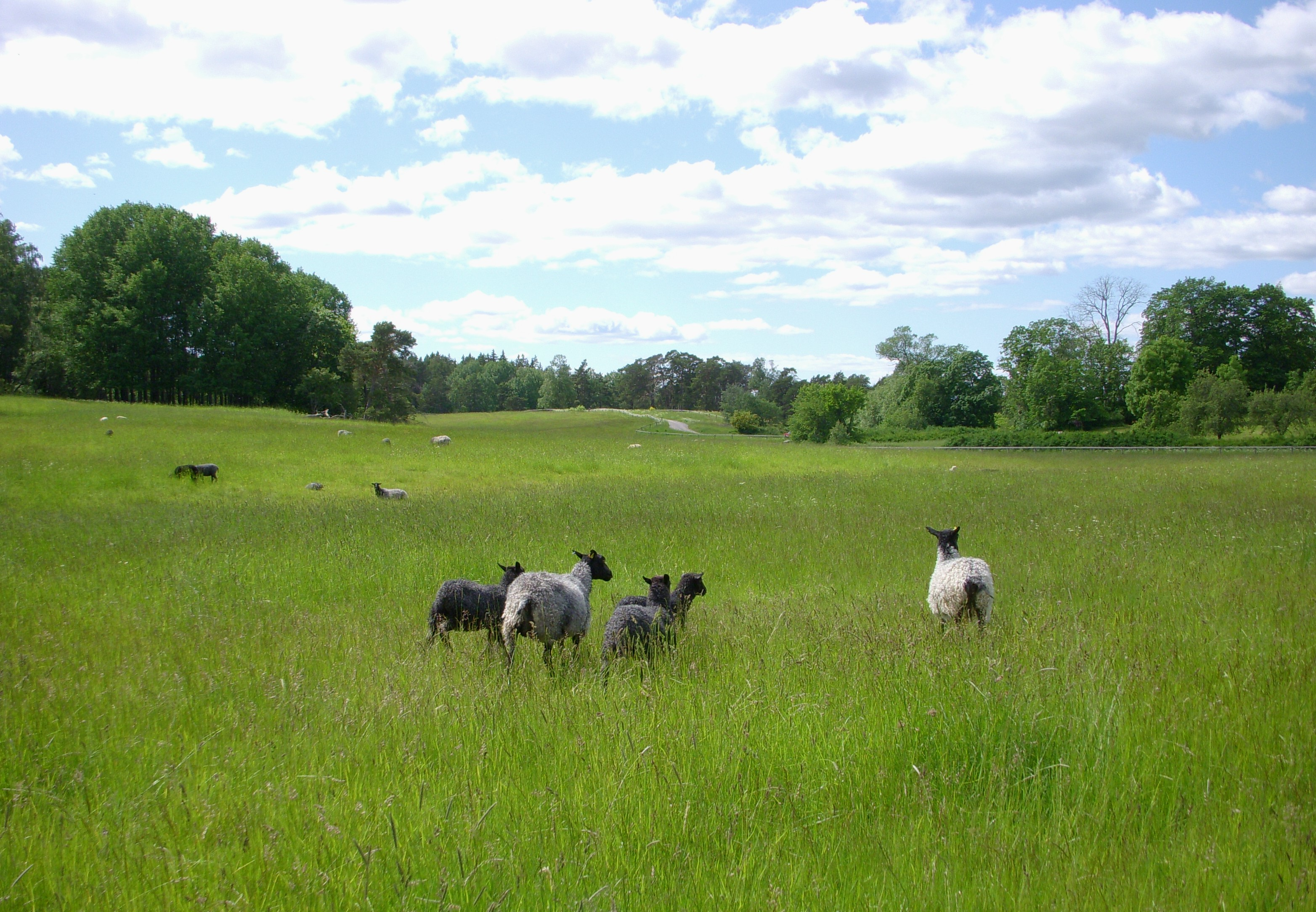
Landscape near Elfvik farm

Approximately 300 to 400 years after the carving of the runes, the inhabitants of Lidingö had established small farms. Lidingö is first mentioned in writing in 1328, in the will of Jedvard Filipsson, in the sentence curiam in Lydhingø meaning a "Lidingö farm".

Bo Jonsson (Grip) (early 1330s – 20 August 1386) bought the entire island between 1376 and 1381. In approximately 1480, the island was taken over by the Banér family from Djursholm. On 29 August 1774, Johan Gabriel Banér (1733–1811) also from Djursholm, sold the entire island and the land was divided into 25 farms.

In the east part of Lidingö, the Långängen-Elfvik nature reserve, which includes 125 acres (0.51 km^{2}) of open farmland and most of the forest land on Elfvik, has, preserved within its boundaries, one of the largest old farms, the Elfviks farm. Most of the original houses, built from the end of the 18th century to mid‑19th century, have been saved and restored. The farm is still active with beef cattle, sheep, and horses and is run by Lidingö Municipality.

The first church was built in 1623.

The IBM educational center for northern Europe, was built close to the Elfvik farm in the early 1960s. The centre was later converted to a hotel.

== Notable people ==
- Hannes Holm (1962 – ), director and screenwriter
- Emma Lundberg (1869 – 1953), artist and architect.

== Sports ==
The following sports clubs are located in Lidingö:

- KFUM Lidingö Basket (basketball section)
- IFK Lidingö - IFK Lidingö FK (soccer section)
- IFK Lidingö - IFK Lidingö SOK (orienteering section)
- IFK Lidingö - IFK Lidingö FRI (track and field athletics section)
- Lidingöloppet, cross-country running event
- Lidingö SK

== Features ==
- Hersbyholm
