= Freygeirr =

Viking chieftain

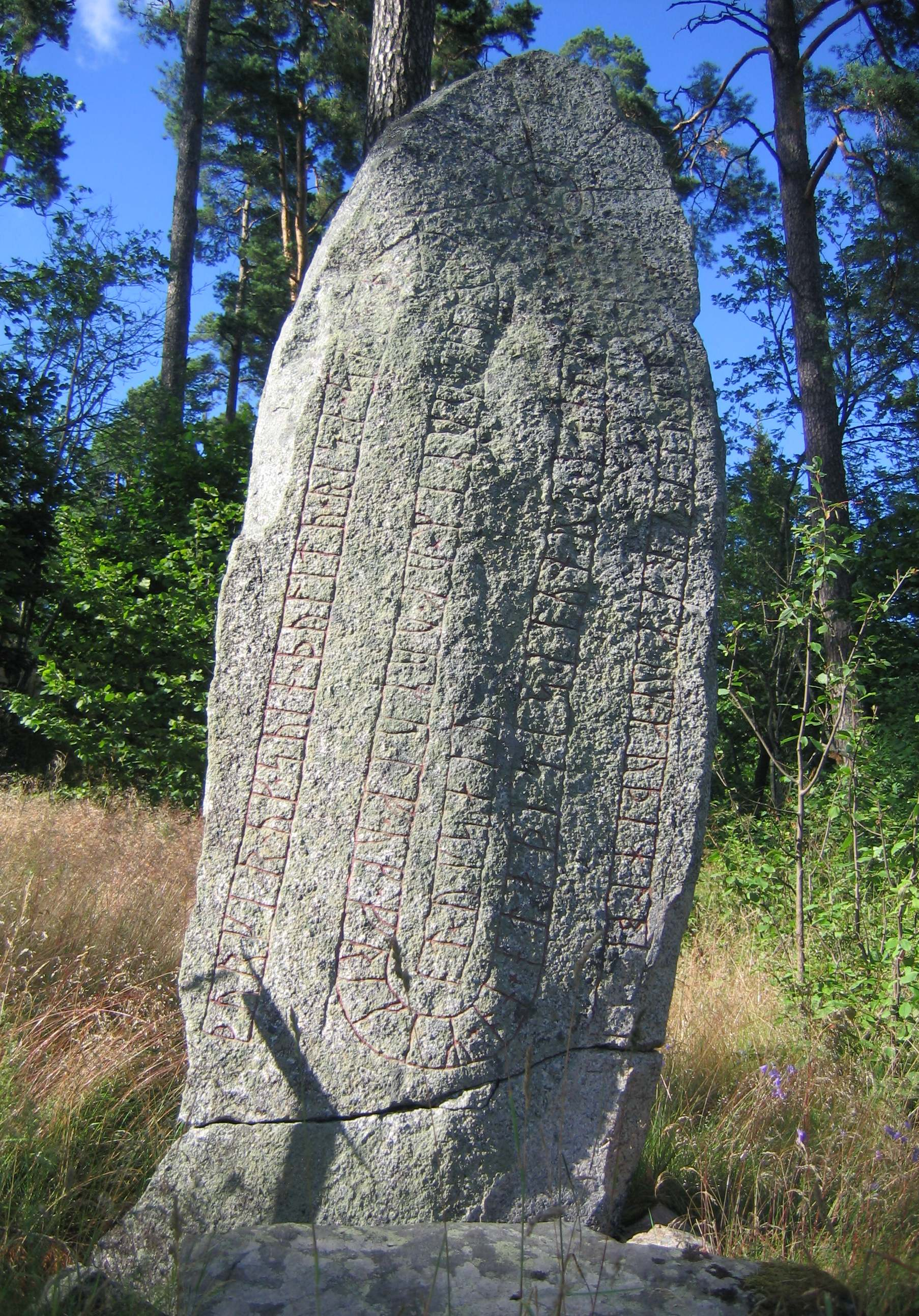
U 518 tells of Freygeir's death, but there are two theories on where it was.

Freygeirr (Old East Norse: FrøygæiRR, Modern Swedish: Fröger) was a Viking chieftain who probably led a leidang expedition. He is considered to have been active in the 1050s on the Baltic coast, and he has been identified on six runestones, Gs 13, DR 216, U 518, U 611, U 698 and U 1158. One of the three brothers who is mentioned on the Stenkvista runestone (Sö 111), which is adorned with a heathen symbol (Mjölnir), is also called Freygeirr.

On the runestone Gs 13, Freygeirr is reported to be the leader of an expedition to Tavastia:

Gs 13: Brúsi had this stone erected in memory of Egill, his brother. And he died in Tafeistaland, when Brúsi brought (= led?) the land's levy(?) (= army) in memory of, his brother. He travelled with Freygeirr. May God and God's mother help his soul. Sveinn and Ásmundr, they marked.

In Denmark, there is a runestone in memory of a warrior who fell in Sweden while he was in the retinue of a man who was either named Friggir or Freygeirr:

DR 216: Ástráðr and Hildungr/Hildvígr/Hildulfr raised this stone in memory of Fraði/Freði, their kinsman. And he was then the terror(?) of men. And he died in Sweden and was thereafter the first(?) in(?) Friggir's(?) retinue(?) and then: all vikings.

U 698 and U 611 are raised in memory of two men who died in the retinue of a warchief whose name has been reconstructed by runologists as Freygeirr:

U 698: [...] had the stone raised in memory of Ásgeirr, his son. He fell in Lífland, abroad in Freygeirr's(?) retinue.
U 611: Bjôrn and Steinfríðr had the stone raised in memory of Gísli. He fell abroad in Freygeirr's(?) retinue.

There is also a runestone reporting where Freygeirr died, runestone U 518:

U 518: Þorgerðr and Sveinn, they had this stone raised in memory of Ormgeirr and Ormulfr and Freygeirr. He met his end in the sound of Sila (Selaön), and the others abroad in Greece. May God help their spirits and souls. ("Greece"—the then Scandinavian term for the Byzantine Empire.)

The Rundata project places Freygeir's death near the island of Selaön in lake Mälaren. According to another theory the runes isilu represent *isi[s]la and they are to be transcribed as *ī ey-sȳsla, i.e. "in Ösel" (Saaremaa).

Another runestone mentioning a Freygeirr was raised by his sons:

U 1158: Guðsteinn(?) and Eistr and ... and Áki had the stone raised in memory of Freygeirr, their father. Lífsteinn cut these runes.

Omeljan Pritsak remarks that Freygeir's son was named Eistr ("Estonian") and he connects the name to Freygeir's activities on the other side of the Baltic Sea. He further suggests that Freygeir's death took place during a joint Swedish-Kievan Rus' expedition against the Estonians of Saaremaa.

== Sources ==
- Jansson, Sven B. (1980). Runstenar. STF, Stockholm. ISBN 91-7156-015-7
- Pritsak, Omeljan. (1981). The Origin of Rus'. Cambridge, Mass.: Distributed by Harvard University Press for the Harvard Ukrainian Research Institute. ISBN 0-674-64465-4
- Rundata
