= Uppland Runic Inscription 932 =

Coordinates: 59°51′28″N 17°37′53″E

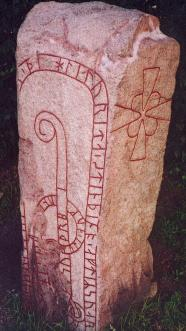
- Created: 11th Century
- Discovered: Uppsala Cathedral, Uppsala, Uppland, Sweden
- Rundata ID: U 932
- Runemaster: Åsmund

Text – Native
- Old Norse : "Muli ... ... [r]etta stæin þenna æftiʀ Svarthaufða, broður sinn. Asmundr. Ingiald/Ingialdr. Muli ok Gunn...(?) o[k] Ig[ulf]astr(?) o[k] ... ... þ[au]n letu retta stæin þenna æftiʀ Svarthauf[ða by]gg[i i] Suðrby.

Translation
- Múli ... ... this stone erected in memory of Svarthǫfði, their brother. Ásmundr, Ingjald/Ingjaldr, Múli and Gunn-...(?) and Ígulfastr(?) and ... ... they had this stone erected in memory of Svarthǫfði. (He) lived in Suðrbýr.

U 932 is the Rundata designation for a Viking Age runestone that was carved by the runemaster Åsmund Kåresson and is located in Uppsala, Sweden.

== Description ==
The runestone was first depicted in 1643, then under the Uppsala Cathedral foundation wall. Before the historic nature of runestones was understood, it was common practice to use them as building material in the construction of buildings, roads, and bridges. During the 1850s, the stone was removed from the wall of the cathedral.

This runestone is inscribed on three sides, two of which contain runes, and the third depicts a Christian cross. A large section of the runic inscription has been destroyed. It is classified as being in runestone style Pr3 or Pr4, also known as the Urnes style. This runestone style is characterized by slim and stylized animals that are interwoven into tight patterns. The animals heads are typically seen in profile with slender almond-shaped eyes and upwardly curled appendages on the noses and the necks.

The place name Suðrbý in the runic text, sometimes read as Suþrbý, refers to the modern hamlet of Söderby located in Näs or Danmark parish.

== Inscription ==
A transliteration of the runic inscription is:

§A muli ' u... ...--------... -ita stin þino ' aftiʀ ' suarthþa brur sin osmuntr ' inkialt
§B muli ' auk| |kun(i)... (a)-- ih...-astr ' au- ----... ...- ' þ--h litu rita ' stin þino ' aftiʀ suarthaf-... ...k-| |- suþrbi

== See also ==
- List of runestones
