= Baltic area runestones =

Clickable map of the geographic distribution of the Baltic expeditions Runestones in southern Sweden (modern administrative borders and cities are shown)

The Baltic area runestones are Viking runestones in memory of men who took part in peaceful or warlike expeditions across the Baltic Sea, where Finland and the Baltic states are presently located.

Beside the runestones treated in this article and in the main article Varangian runestones, there are many other runestones that talk of eastward voyages such as the Greece runestones, Italy runestones, and inscriptions left by the Varangian Guard. Other runestones that deal with Varangian expeditions include the Ingvar runestones (erected in honor or memory of those who travelled to the Caspian Sea with Ingvar the Far-Travelled). In addition, there were also voyages to Western Europe mentioned on runestones that are treated in the articles Viking runestones, England runestones and Hakon Jarl runestones.

Below follows a presentation of the runestones based on the Rundata project. The transcriptions into Old Norse are mostly in the Swedish and Danish dialect to facilitate comparison with the inscriptions, while the English translation provided by Rundata gives the names in the de facto standard dialect (the Icelandic and Norwegian dialect):

== Uppland ==
=== U 180 ===
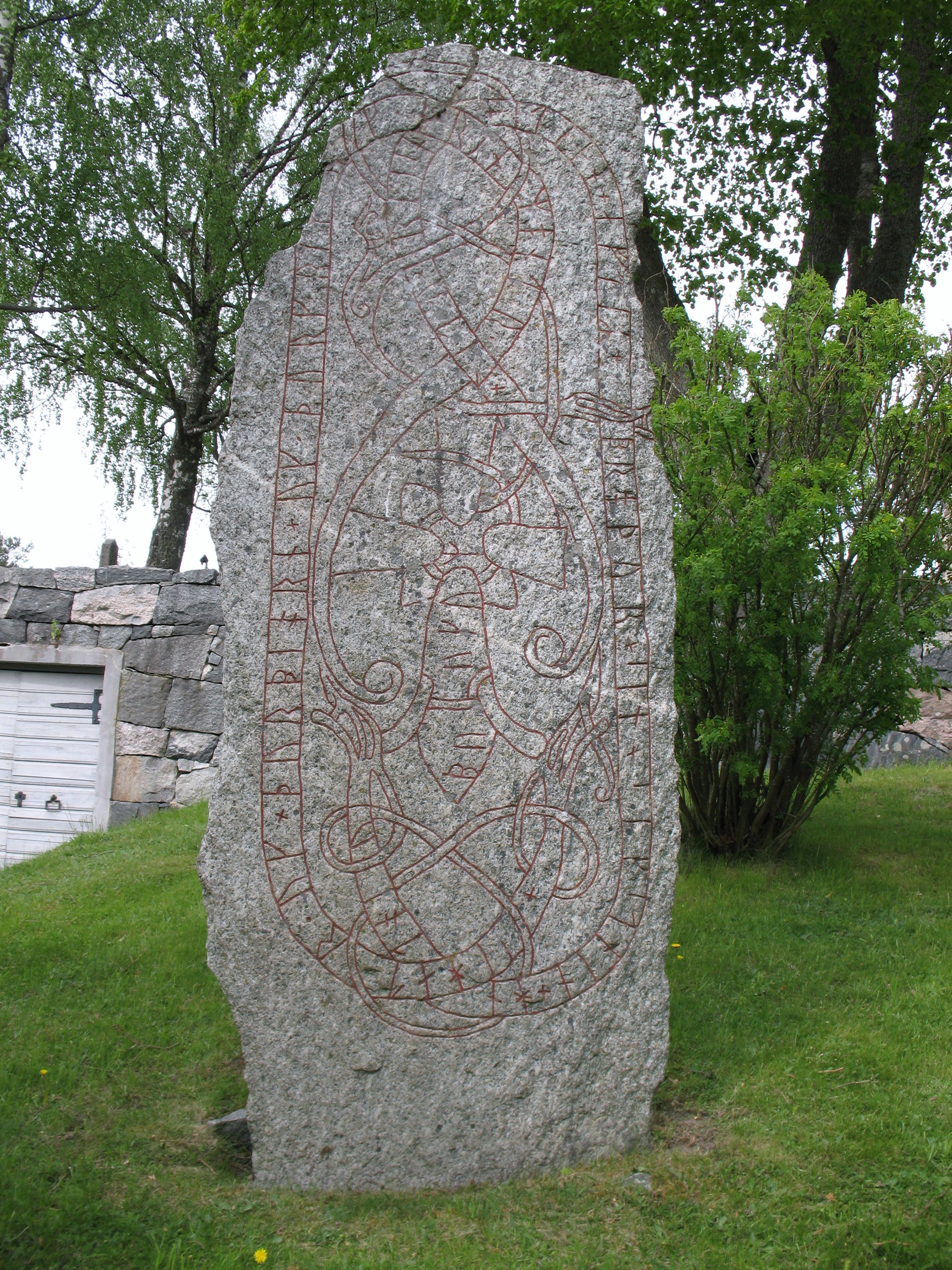
U 180.

This runestone is possibly in style Pr4 and it is located at the church of Össeby-Garn. It was made by the runemaster Visäte. The stone commemorates a man who either died in Viborg, Jutland, or in Vyborg, Karelia. Part of the inscription's text "he died in Véborg" is written on the design's cross, which may have indicated to those at home that Sigsteinn, while dying abroad, had received proper Christian burial treatment.

+ sihatr * uk + þurbiorn + uk * þurkri(m) + uk * erinmontr '× litu × reisn + stein + aftiʀ + broþur + sin + sikstnin + hn to i uib(u)(r)kum
{} Sighvatr {} ok {} Þorbiorn {} ok {} Þorgrimʀ {} ok {} Ærinmundr {} letu {} ræisa {} stæin {} æftiʀ {} broður {} sinn {} Sigstæin. {} Hann do i Viborgum.
Sighvatr and Þorbjǫrn and Þorgrímr and Erinmundr had the stone raised in memory of their brother Sigsteinn. He died in Véborg."

=== U 214 ===
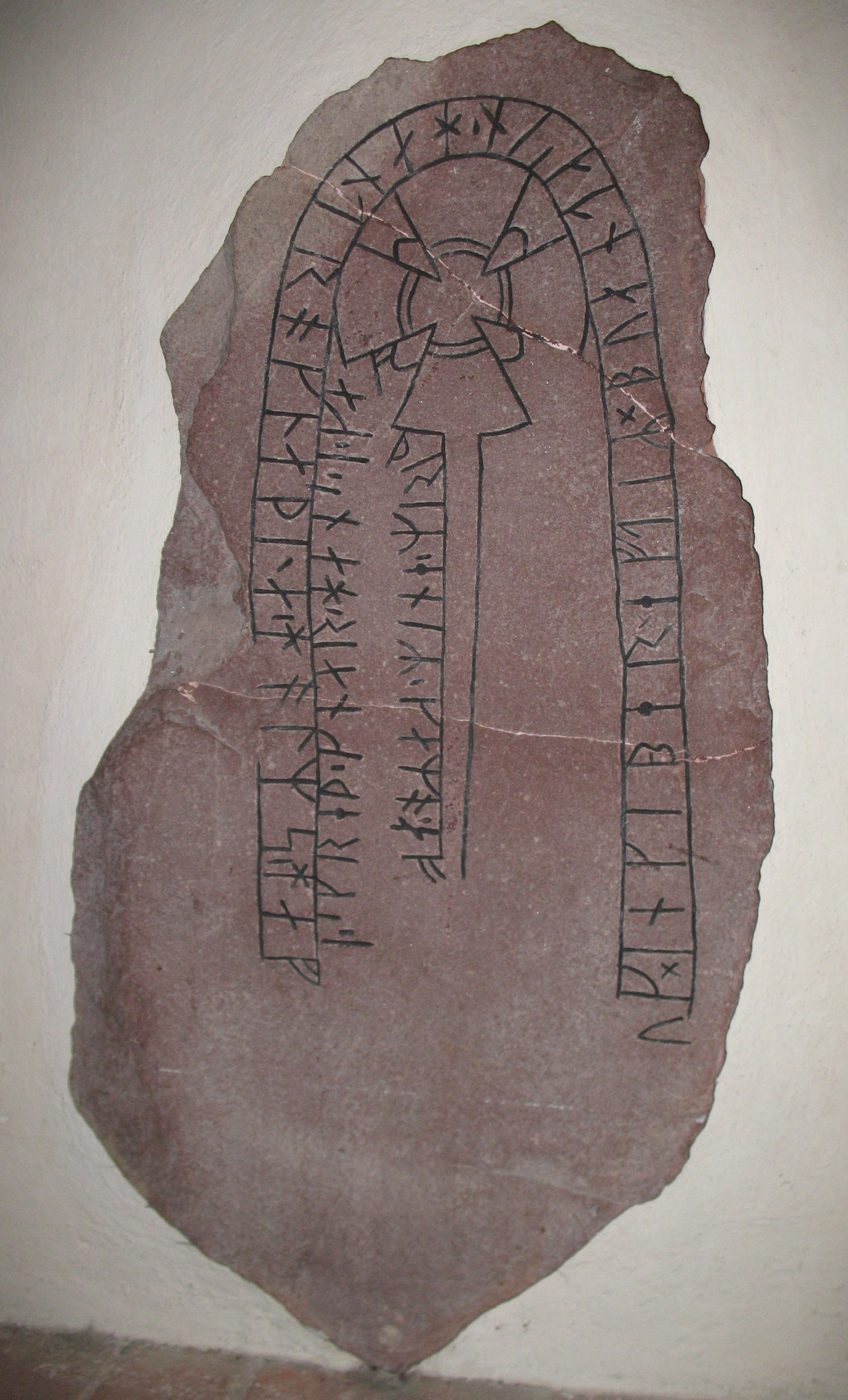
U 214.

This runestone from c. 1100 is in the style RAK. It is in the wall of the porch of the church of Vallentuna. The U 215 contains the first part of the message. The stones were carved in memory of a man who drowned in Holmr's sea, but runologists are divided on the meaning of the expression. One interpretation proposed by Jansson is that it means the "Novgorodian sea" and refers to the Gulf of Finland. The runestone provides the earliest Swedish attestation of an end rhyme, whereas the earliest Old Norse attestation is Höfuðlausn composed by Egill Skallagrímsson.

... uk × inkiber × eftiʀ × buanta × sin ' han ' troknaþi ÷ a ' holms ' hafi ' skreþ ' knar ' hans ' i ' kaf þriʀ ' eniʀ ' kamo ' af
... ok {} Ingebærg {} æftiʀ {} boanda {} sinn. {} Hann {} drunknaði {} a {} Holms {} hafi, {} skræið {} knarr {} hans {} i {} kaf, þriʀ {} æiniʀ {} kvamu {} af.
"... and Ingibjǫrg in memory of her husbandman. He drowned in Holmr's sea - his cargo-ship drifted to the sea-bottom - only three came out (alive)."

Swedish translation:

"... och Ingeberg efter bonde sin. Han drunknade på Holms hav, skred knarr hans i kvav, tre endast kommo av."

=== U 346 ===
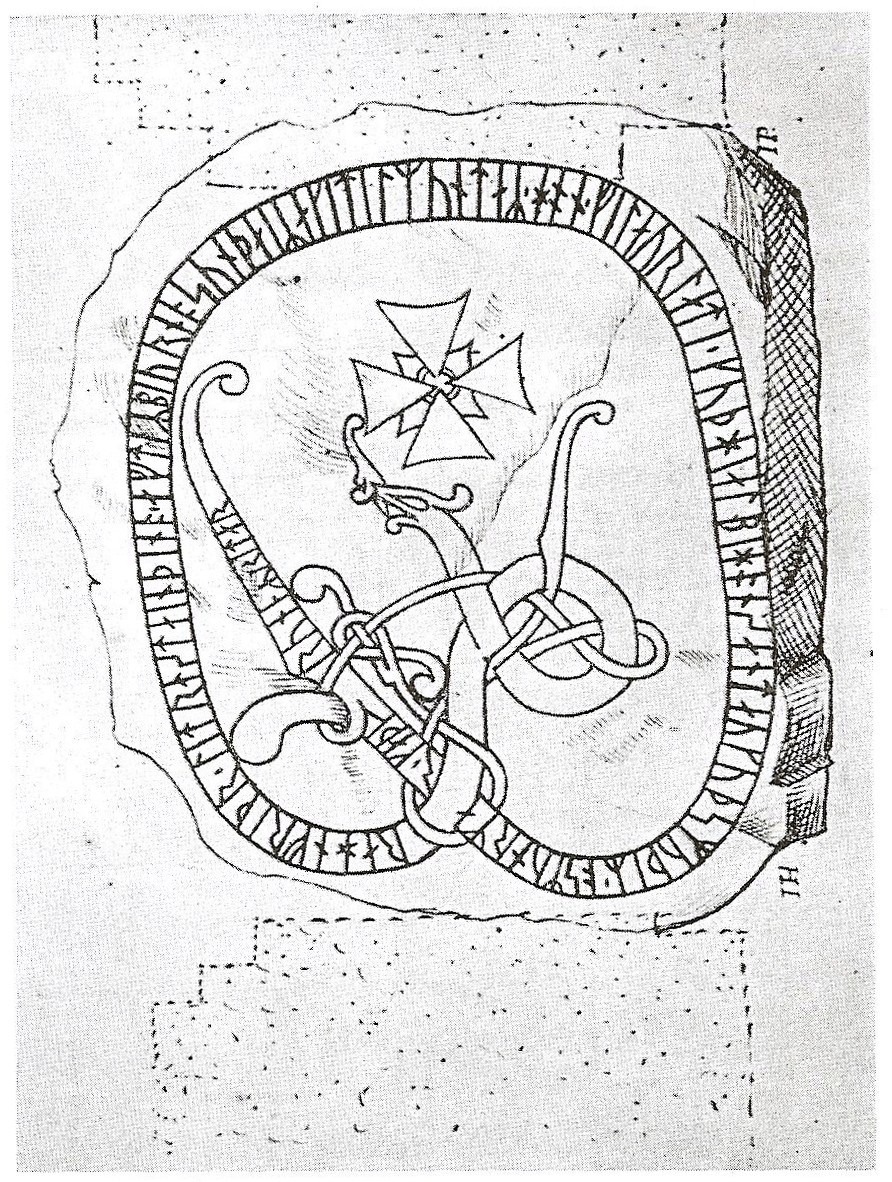
The runestone U 346 in a 17th-century drawing.

This runestone has disappeared but it was located at the church of Frösunda. It was made by the runemaster Åsmund Kåresson in style Pr3-Pr4, and it was raised in memory of a man who died in Virland. It contains the same message as U 356.

[rahnfriþr * lit rt stain þino ' aftiʀ biurno sun þaiʀa kitilmuntaʀ ' hon ' fil a urlati ' kuþ hialbi hons ant auk| |kuþs muþiʀ ' osmunr mar'kaþi runaʀ ritar]
Ragnfriðr {} let retta stæin þenna {} æftiʀ Biorn, sun þæiʀa Kætilmundaʀ. {} Hann {} fell a Virlandi. {} Guð hialpi hans and ok Guðs moðiʀ. {} Asmundr markaði runaʀ rettaʀ.
"Ragnfríðr had this stone erected in memory of Bjǫrn, her son and Ketilmundr's. He fell in Virland. May God and God's mother help his spirit. Ásmundr marked the right runes."

=== U 356 ===
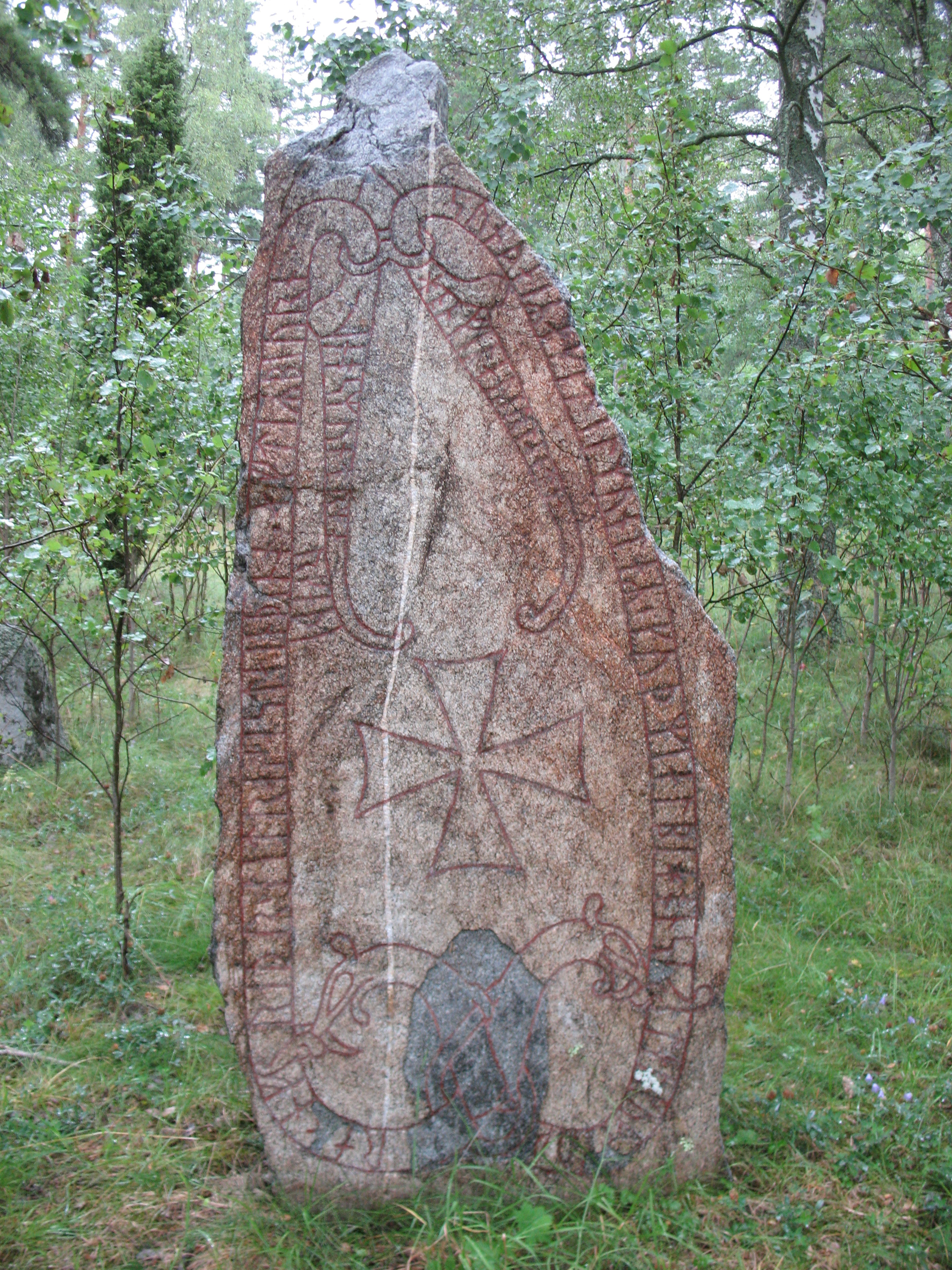
U 356.

This runestone in style Pr3 is located in Ängby. It was made by the runemaster Åsmund Kåresson for a lady in memory of her son who died in Virland. It contains the same message as U 346.

ra(h)nfriþr ' lit rasa stain þino ' aftiʀ biurn * sun þaiʀa * kitilmun(t)aʀ ' kuþ mialbi hons (a)nt auk| |kuþs (m)uþiʀ hon fil a uirlanti * in osmuntr markaþi
Ragnfriðr {} let ræisa stæin þenna {} æftiʀ Biorn, {} sun þæiʀa {} Kætilmundaʀ. {} Guð hialpi hans and ok Guðs moðiʀ. Hann fell a Virlandi. {} En Asmundr markaði.
"Ragnfríðr had this stone raised in memory of Bjǫrn, her son and Ketilmundr's. May God and God's mother help his spirit. He fell in Virland. And Ásmundr marked."

=== U 439 ===
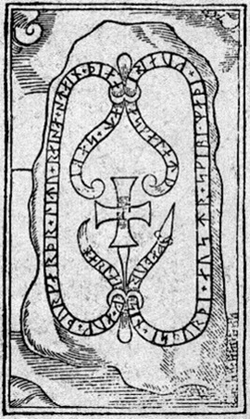
A drawing by Johan Bureus, before the stone disappeared.

This runestone in style Fp is one of the Ingvar Runestones and due to uncertainties as to the decipherment also one of the Serkland Runestones. It was located at Steninge Palace, but it is lost. Johan Bureus, one of the first prominent Swedish runologists, visited Steninge on May 8, 1595, and made a drawing of the runestone which stood by the jetty. Only 50 years later it had disappeared and in a letter written in 1645 it was explained that the stone had been used in the construction of a new stone jetty. The inscription contained an Old Norse poem.

[harlaif × auk × þurkarþr × litu × raisa × stain × þina at × sabi faþur sin × is| |sturþi × austr × skibi × maþ ikuari a/a| |askalat-/skalat-]
Hærlæif {} ok {} Þorgærðr {} letu {} ræisa {} stæin {} þenna at {} Sæbiorn, faður sinn. {} Es styrði {} austr {} skipi {} með Ingvari a Æistaland(?)/Særkland[i](?).
"Herleif and Þorgerðr had this stone raised in memory of Sæbjǫrn, their father, who steered a ship east with Ingvarr to Estonia(?)/Serkland(?)."

=== U 533 ===
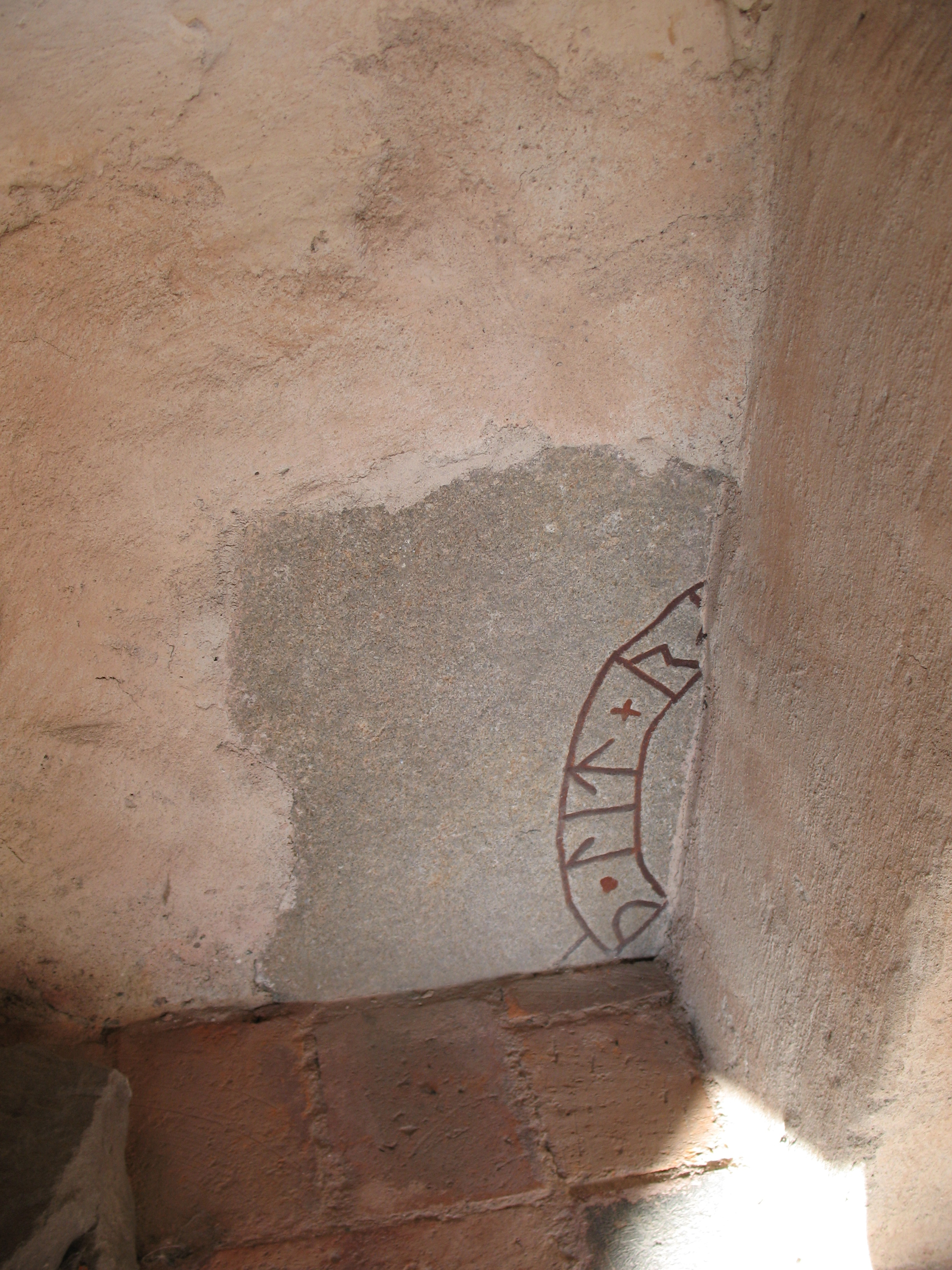
U 533.

This runestone is in the wall inside the porch of the church of Roslags-Bro. It is in style Pr1, and it was raised in memory of a man who died in Virland (in Estonia). The style shows that it was made by the runemaster Torbjörn Skald.

* sigruþ * lit + raisa * stain * eftir + anunt * sun * sin * han uas ' tribin + a + uirlanti
{} Sigruð {} let {} ræisa {} stæin {} æftiʀ {} Anund, {} sun {} sinn. {} Hann vas {} drepinn {} a {} Virlandi.
"Sigþrúðr had the stone raised in memory of ǫnundr, her son. He was killed in Virland."

=== U 582 ===
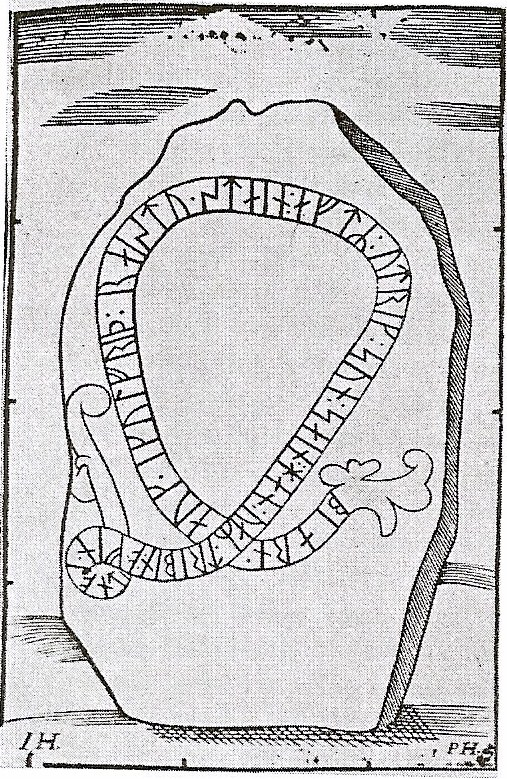
The runestone U 582 in a 17th-century drawing.

This runestone has disappeared but it was located at the church of Söderby-Karl. It was possibly in style Pr1 and it commemorated a son who died in what is called Finland. At this time, Finland referred to the south-western part of what today is Finland.

[biarn huk * ikulfriþ : raistu : stain : aftʀ : utrik : sun : sain * han * uaʀ : tribin : o * fin*lonti]
Biorn ok {} Igulfrið {} ræistu {} stæin {} æftiʀ {} Otrygg, {} sun {} sinn. {} Hann {} vaʀ {} drepinn {} a {} Finnlandi.
"Bjǫrn and Ígulfríðr raised the stone in memory of Ótryggr, their son. He was killed in Finland."

=== U 698 ===
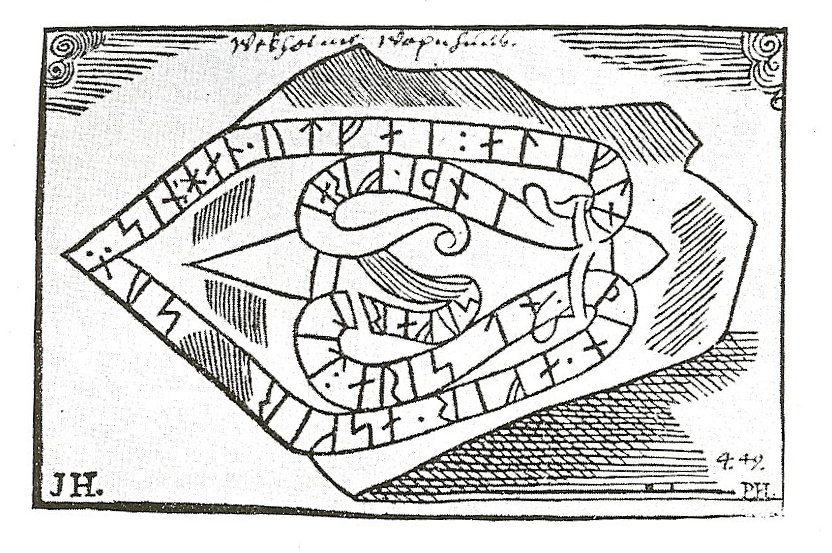
The runestone U 698 in a 17th-century drawing.

This runestone has disappeared but it was located at the church of Veckholm. It was in style Pr2-Pr3. The inscription was considered difficult to read, but it refers to a man who fell in Livonia, and possibly in an expedition led by Freygeirr.

[sufar lit : aristn * þin * afir * askir sun : sin : han * ut fai : a liflai|n|þ|i| |i| |i|n|þ|i * frai...]
<sufar> let {} ræisa {} stæin {} æftiʀ {} Asgæiʀ, sun {} sinn. {} Hann {} uti fioll {} a Liflandi i liði {} Frøy[gæiʀs](?).

[sufar lit : aristn * þin * afir * askir sun : sin : han * ut fai : a liflai|n|þ| i| |i|n|þ|i * frai...]
<sufar> let {} ræisa {} stæin {} æftiʀ {} Asgæiʀ, sun {} sinn. {} Hann {} ut fioll {} a Lifland i liði {} Frøy[gæiʀs](?).
"<sufar> had the stone raised in memory of Ásgeirr, his son. He fell in Lífland, abroad in Freygeirr's(?) retinue."

== Södermanland ==
=== Sö 39 ===
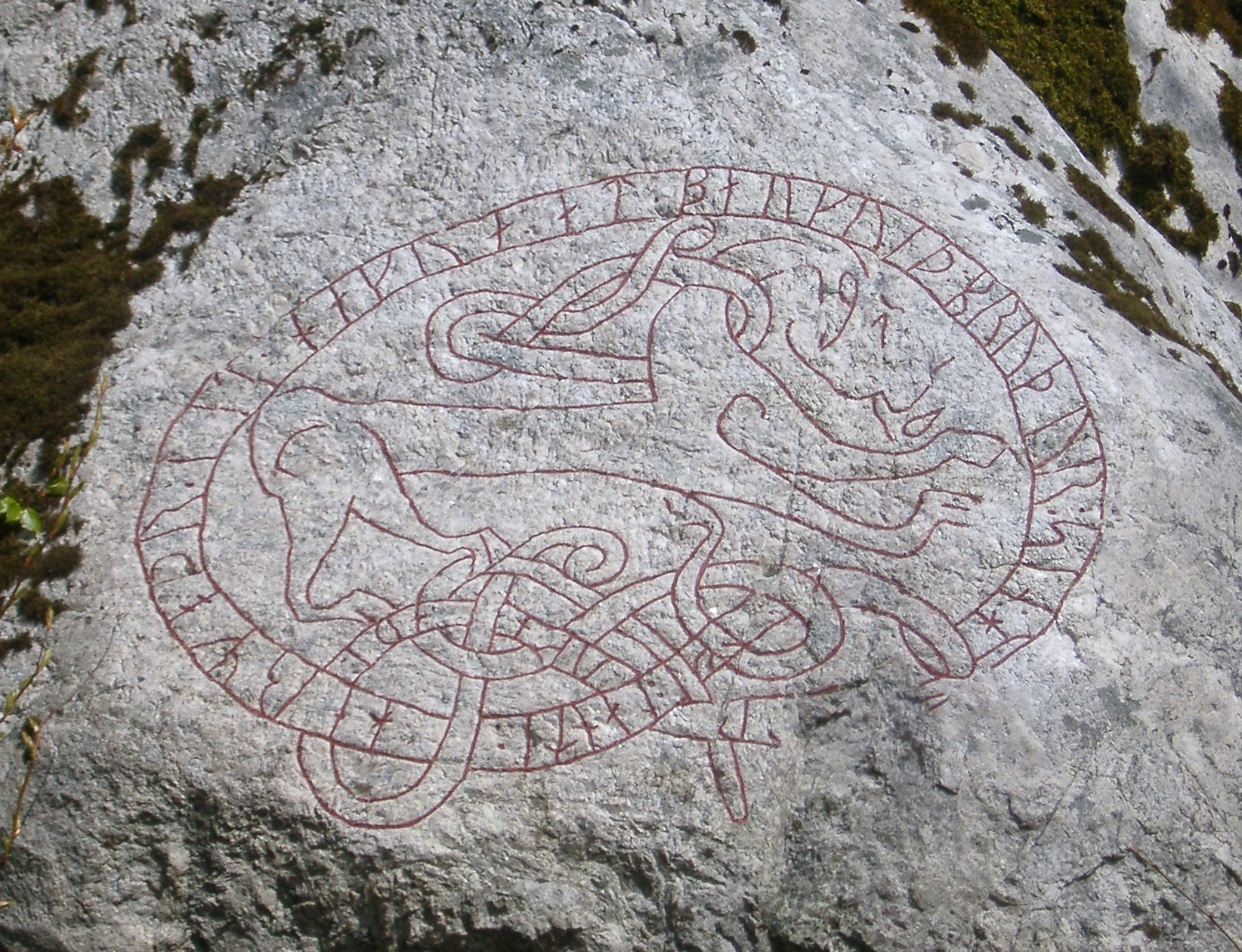
Sö 39.

This is a runic inscription on bedrock at Åda. It is in style Pr3 and it commemorates a brother who drowned in Livonia.

: hermoþr : lit : hagua : at : barkuiþ : bruþur : sin : h[an] trukn-þi : [a] lf:lanti :
{} Hærmoðr {} let {} haggva {} at {} Bergvið/Barkvið, {} broður {} sinn. {} Hann drunkn[a]ði {} a Liflandi. {}
"Hermóðr had (the rock) cut in memory of Bergviðr/Barkviðr, his brother. He drowned in Lífland."

=== Sö 198 ===
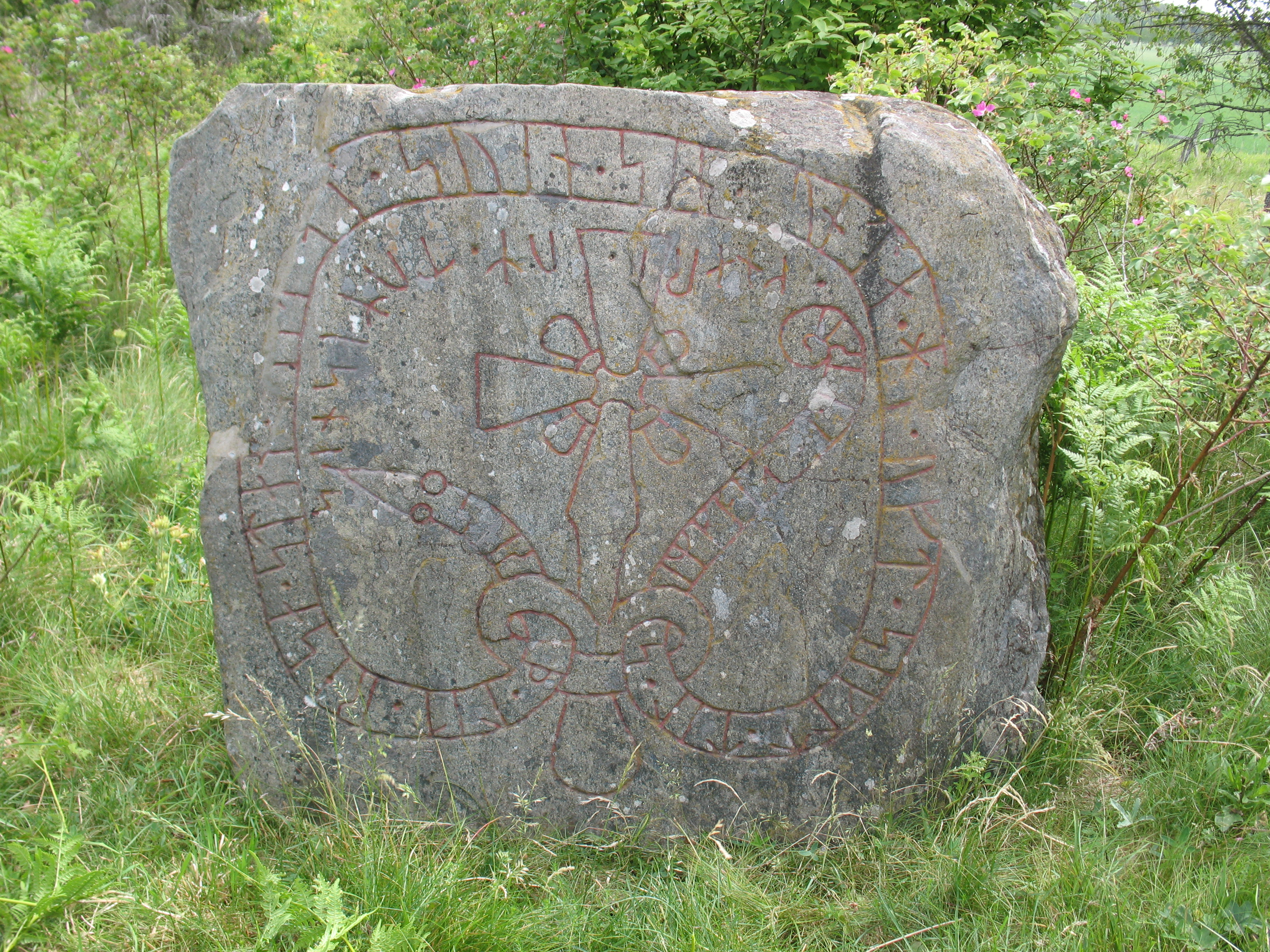
Sö 198.

This runestone in style Fp is found in Mervalla on the island of Selaön in lake Mälaren. It is raised in memory of a man who regularly sailed a valuable knarr to Zemgale, passing Cape Kolka (Dómisnes). North of the Cape there is a long underwater reef which probably was infamous among the sailors of the Viking Age, and this is probably why Sigríðr wanted posterity to know that her husband had often passed it. The expression dyrum knærri ("valued cargo-ship") is an instrumental dative and it also appears in a famous stanza by the Icelander Egill Skallagrímsson. Egill had written that his mother had promised him a fast ship so that he could sail with the Vikings and

standa upp í stafni stýra dýrum knerri	Stand in the stern, Steer a dear vessel,

siriþ * lit * resa * stan * [þin](a) [*] (a)(t) * suen * sin * [b]unta * h[n] * uft * siklt * til * simk(a)(l)(a) * t(u)ru[m] * knari * um * tumisnis
Sigrið {} let {} ræisa {} stæin {} þenna {} at {} Svæin, {} sinn {} bonda. {} Hann {} oft {} siglt {} til {} Sæimgala, {} dyrum {} knærri, {} um {} Domisnæs.
"Sigríðr had this stone raised in memory of Sveinn, her husbandman. He often sailed a valued cargo-ship to Seimgalir, around Dómisnes."

== Gästrikland ==
=== Gs 13 ===
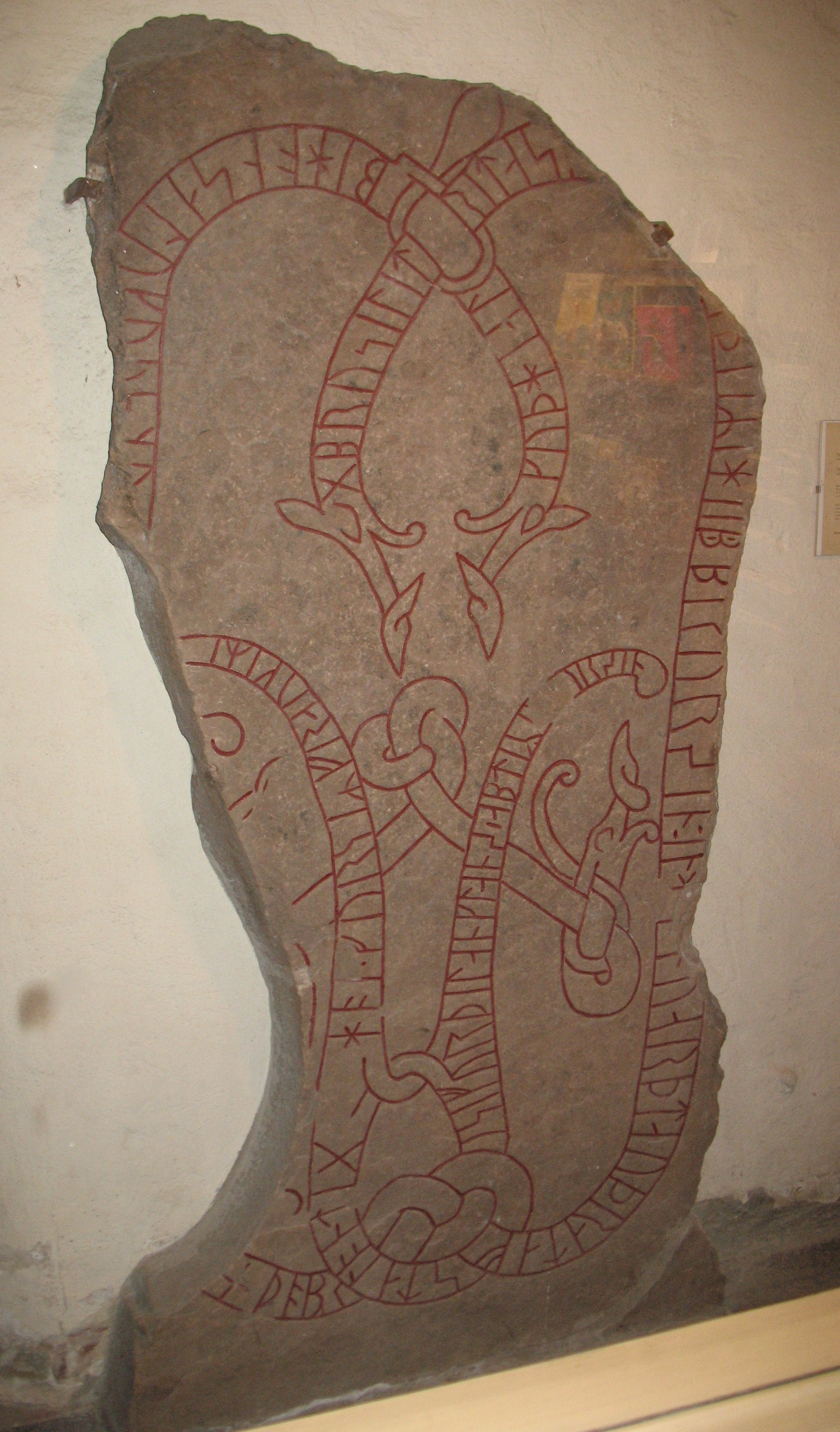
Gs 13.

This runestone in sandstone is found in the church of the holy trinity in Gävle. It is in style Pr2 and it commemorates a brother name Egill who died in Tavastia. Åsmund Kåresson was one of the runemasters. Egill probably fell in a leidang expedition, led by Freygeirr who was a military leader.

× brusi lit rita s-... ... [(a)]b--ʀ (i)h(i)(l) brur sin : in h-n uarþ tauþr a tafstalonti × þo brusi furþi lank lans ' abtiʀ [br](u)r sin h(o)[n] fur (m)iʀ fraukiʀi kuþ hialbi hons| |salu| |uk| |kuþ(s) (m)(u)[þiʀ ' suain ' uk osmunrt ' þaiʀ markaþu] +
{} Brusi let retta s[tæin þenna] æf[ti]ʀ Ægil, broður sinn. {} En h[a]nn varð dauðr a Tafæistalandi, {} þa Brusi førði læiðang(?) lands {} æftiʀ broður sinn. Hann for meðr Frøygæiʀi. Guð hialpi hans salu ok Guðs moðiʀ. {} Svæinn {} ok Asmundr {} þæiʀ markaðu. {}
Translation by Sven B.F Jansson 1981: "Brúsi had this stone erected in memory of Egill, his brother. And he died in Tafeistaland, when Brúsi brought (= led?) the land's levy(?) (= army) in memory of, his brother. He travelled with Freygeirr. May God and God's mother help his soul. Sveinn and Ásmundr, they marked." Translation by Henrik Williams 2005: "Brúsi had this stone erected in memory of Egill, his brother. And he died in Tafeistaland, when Brúsi bore long-spear (=battle standard) after his brother. He travelled with Freygeirr. May God and God's mother help his soul. Sveinn and Ásmundr, they marked."

== Västergötland ==
=== Vg 181 ===
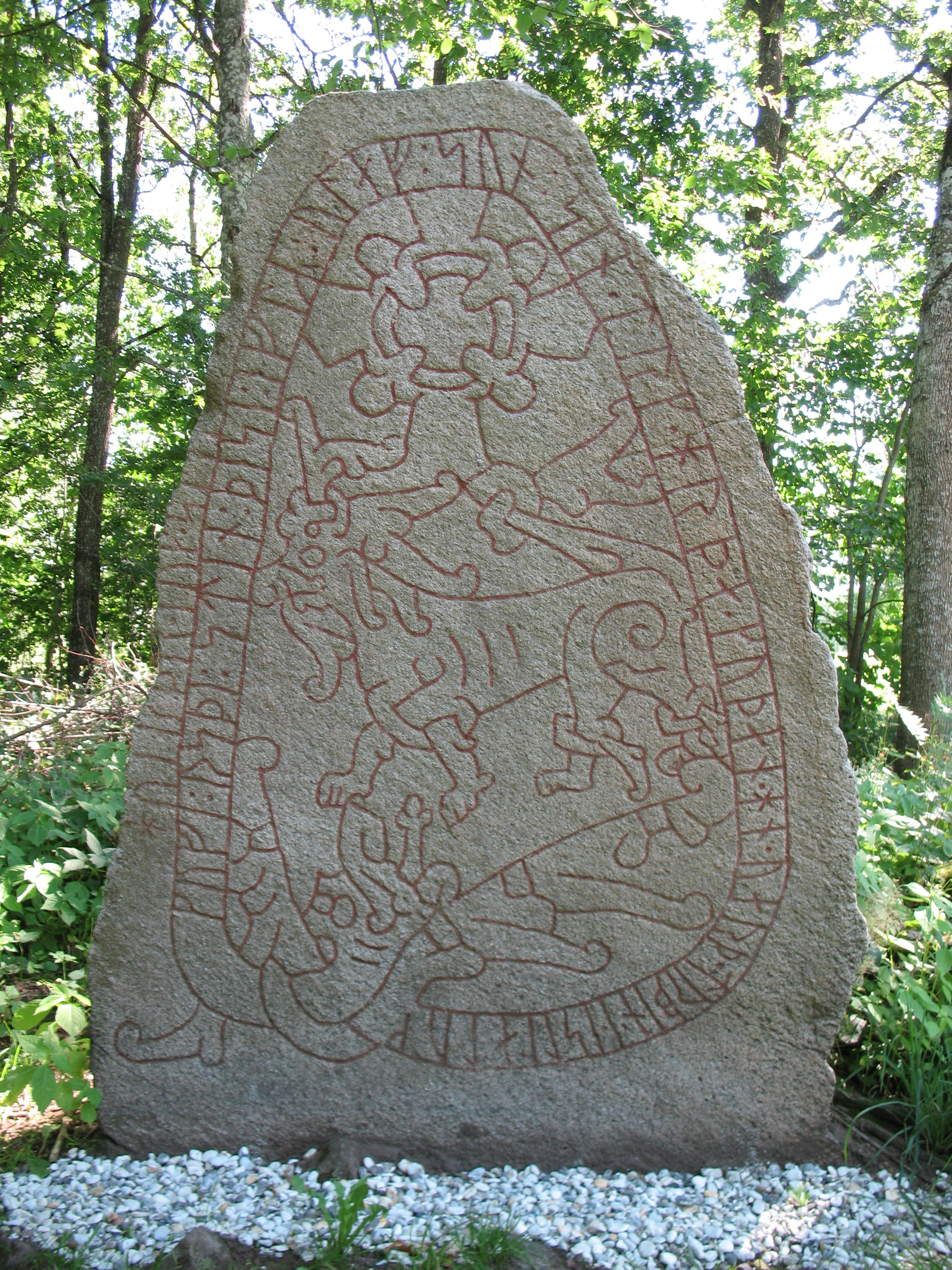
Vg 181.

This runestone in style Pr1 is found at Frugården. It was raised in memory of a man who died in Estonia.

kufi : rsþi : stin : þesi : eftʀ : ulaf : sun : sin * trk * hrþa * kuþan * hn * uarþ * trbin * i * estlatum * hu(a)rþ(r) * iuk * s---
Gufi {} ræisti {} stæin {} þennsi {} æftiʀ {} Olaf, {} sun {} sinn, {} dræng {} harða {} goðan. {} Hann {} varð {} drepinn {} i {} Æistlandum. {} Havarðr(?) {} hiogg {} s[tæin].
"Gufi raised this stone in memory of Ólafr, his son, a very good valiant man. He was killed in Estonia. Hávarðr(?) cut the stone."

== Gotland ==
=== G 135 ===
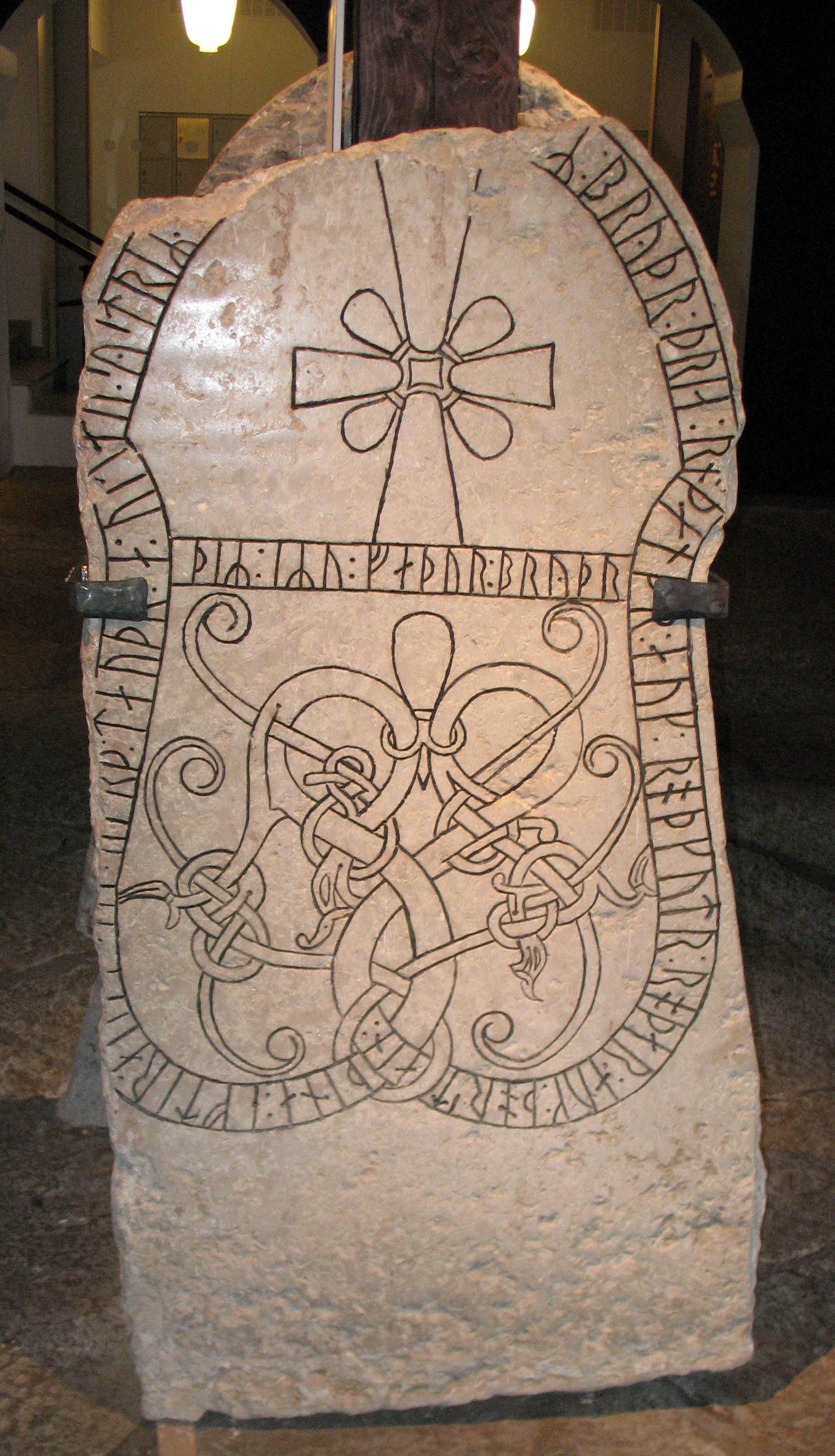
G 135.

This runestone, originally located in Sjonhems, tells of the same family as G 134 and G 136, and it was made in memory of a man who died in Vindau (Ventspils, Latvia).

þina : eftir : a(i)--- : --- : --rþ : tauþr : a : ui(t)au : systriʀ : [tuaʀ] ...-ʀ : bryþr : þria : roþanþr : auk : roþkutr : roþar : auk : þorstain : þiʀ : iʀu : faþur:bryþr
Þenna {} æftiʀ {} Æi... {} ... {} [va]rð {} dauðr {} a {} Vindau/Vindö. {} Systriʀ {} tvaʀ ... {} brøðr {} þria. {} Hroðvaldr(?) {} ok {} Hroðgautr, {} Hroðarr {} ok {} Þorstæinn, {} þæiʀ {} eʀu {} faðurbrøðr.
This (one) in memory of Ei-... (who) died at Vindey/Vindö. Two sisters ... three brothers. Hróðvaldr(?) and Hróðgautr, Hróðarr and Þorsteinn, they are the father's brothers."

=== G 319 ===
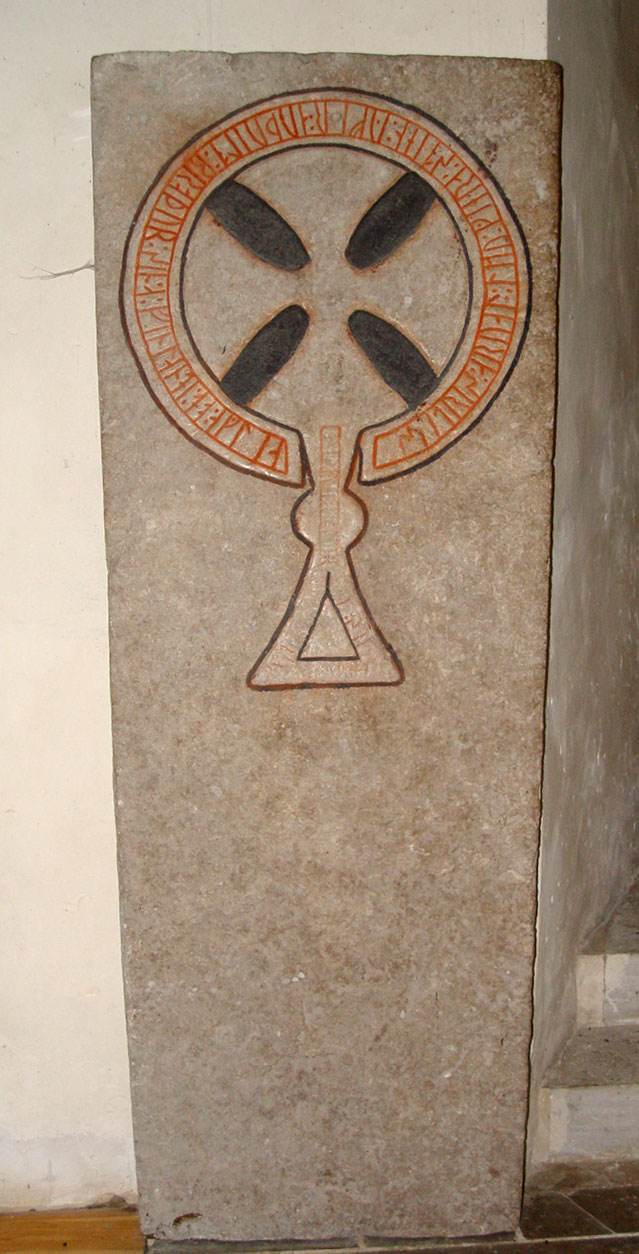
G 319.

This is a late runic inscription on a grave which is dated to the early 13th century. It is located in Rute Church and it commemorates a man who died in Finland.

si[h]tris : aruar[r] : litu : giera : st[a]en : yfir : auþu-l- : broþur : sin : a : finlandi : do : aglia...
Sigtryggs(?) {} arfaʀ {} letu {} gæra {} stæinn {} yfiʀ {} Auðv[a]l[d](?), {} broður {} sinn, {} a {} Finnlandi {} do {} <aglia...>.
"Sigtryggr's(?) heirs had the stone made over Auðvaldr(?), their brother, who died in Finland ..."

== See also ==
- List of runestones

== References and sources ==
Sources

- Andrén, Anders (2003). "The Meaning of Animal Art: An Interpretation of Scandinavian Rune-Stones". In Veit, Ulrich (ed.). Spuren und Botschaften: Interpretationen Materieller Kultur. Waxmann Verlag. ISBN 3-8309-1229-3.
- Jansson, Sven B. F. (1980). Runstenar. STF, Stockholm. ISBN 91-7156-015-7
- Jones, Gwyn (2001) [1968]. A History of the Vikings. London; New York: Oxford University Press. ISBN 0-19-280134-1.
- Peterson, Lena. Nordisk Runnamnslexikon Swedish Institute for Linguistics and Heritage (Institutet för språk och folkminnen).
- Pritsak, Omeljan. (1981). The Origin of Rus'. Cambridge, Mass.: Distributed by Harvard University Press for the Harvard Ukrainian Research Institute. ISBN 0-674-64465-4
- Project Samnordisk Runtextdatabas Svensk - Rundata
- Williams, Henrik. (2005). Vittnat runstenen från Söderby (Gs 13) om Sveriges första ledungståg? Runfilologi och konsten att läsa som det står. ISSN 0349-0416
