= Östergötland Runic Inscription MÖLM1960;230 =

Coordinates: 58°27′05″N 15°49′47″E

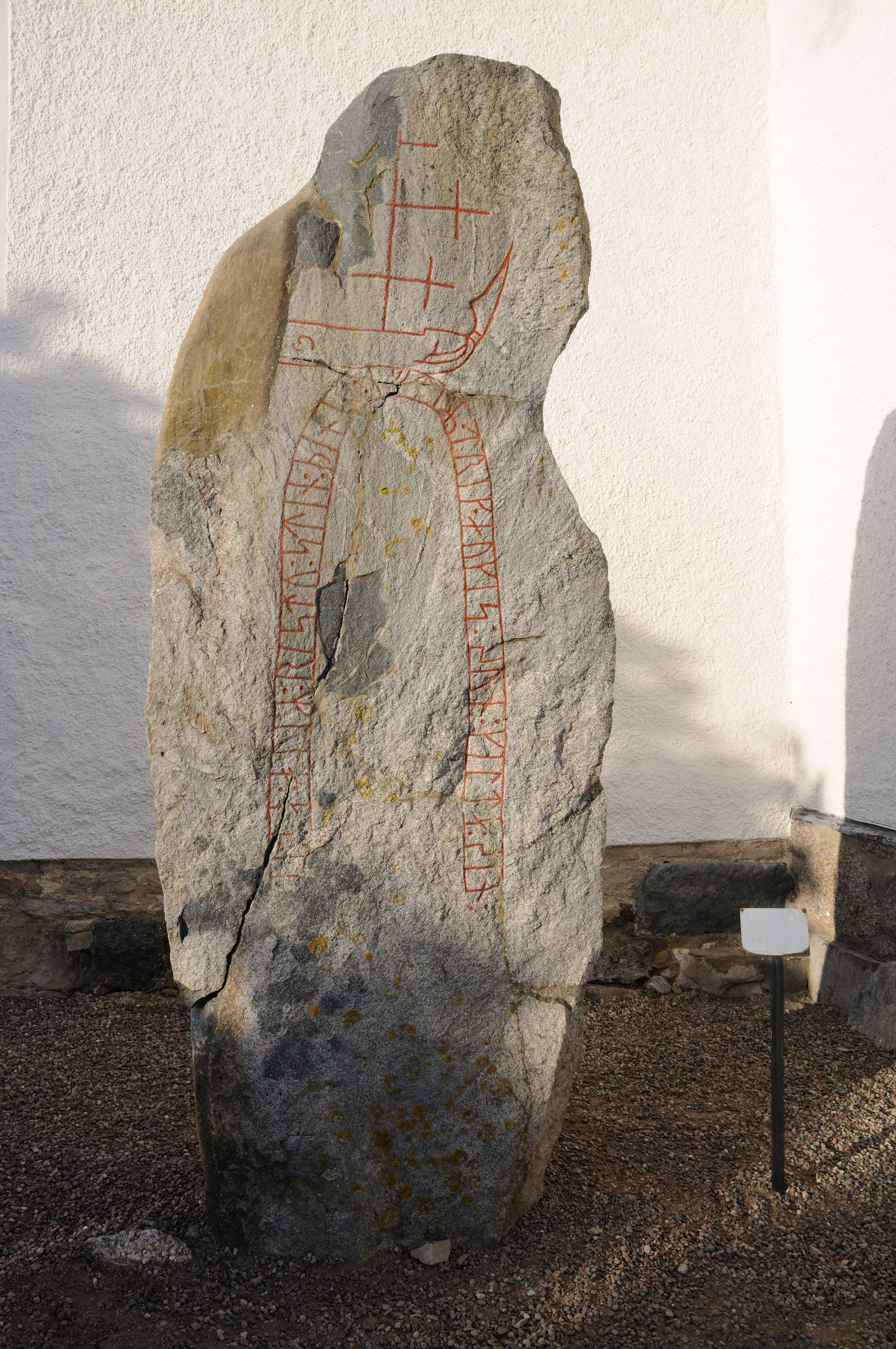
Runestone Ög MÖLM1960;230 from Törnevalla, Sweden.

Östergötland Runic Inscription MÖLM1960;230 or Ög MÖLM1960;230 is the Rundata catalog number for a memorial runestone that is located near a church in Törnevalla, which is 2 kilometers east of Linghem, Östergötland County, Sweden, which was in the historic province of Östergötland. The runestone has an inscription which refers to a Viking Age mercantile guild and depicts a ship.

== Description ==
Runestone Ög MÖLM1960;230 was rediscovered in the base of a church tower in 1960. Before the historic significance of runestones was understood, they were often reused as building materials for roads, churches, and other buildings. After being repaired, it was raised outside of the church. The runic inscription on this granite stone, which is 2.4 meters in height, consists of text in the younger futhark within an arching text band that is under a depiction of a ship. The inscription is classified as being carved in runestone style RAK, which is the classification used for text bands that have straight ends and do not have any attached serpent or beast heads.

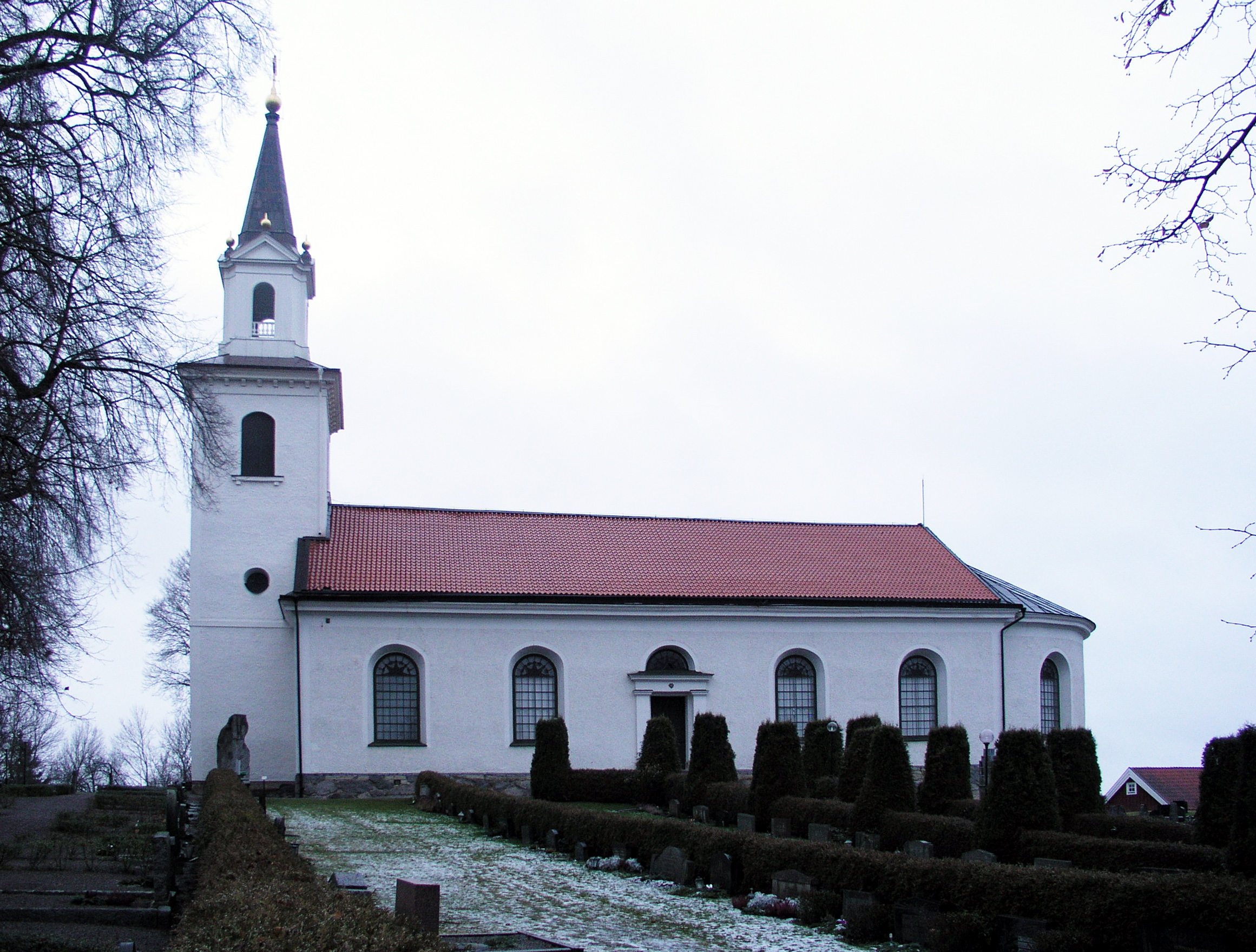
The church at Tornevalla showing the runestone in front of the church tower.

Ship images appear on several Viking Age runic inscriptions. Other runic inscriptions from the Viking Age which depict ships include DR 77 in Hjermind, DR 119 in Spentrup, DR 220 in Sønder Kirkeby, DR 258 in Bösarp, DR 271 in Tullstorp, DR 328 in Holmby, DR EM85;523 in Farsø, Ög 181 in Ledberg, Ög 224 in Stratomta, Sö 122 in Skresta, Sö 154 in Skarpåker, Sö 158 in Österberga, Sö 164 in Spånga, Sö 351 in Överjärna, Sö 352 in Linga, Vg 51 in Husaby, U 370 in Herresta, U 979 in Gamla Uppsala, U 1052 in Axlunda, U 1161 in Altuna, and Vs 17 in Råby. Three stones, the Hørdum and Långtora kyrka stones and U 1001 in Rasbo, depict ships but currently do not have any runes on them and may never have had any.

The runic text, which is damaged at the beginning, indicates that the stone is a memorial to a man named Drengr who was the son of a man possibly named Eygeirr, and that the person or persons who sponsored the stone and Drengr were members of a guild. This is one of four runestones that mention guilds in Viking Age Sweden, the others being U 379 in Kyrkogården, U 391 in Prästgatan, and Ög 64 in Bjälbo. These stones and others discussing félags are evidence of the trading activities during this period of Scandinavian history. One scholar has suggested that the image of the ship may have been a type of heraldic badge or symbol of the guild that raised the stone.

The name Drengr is a bit unusual as it normally is a title associated with warriors or merchants. However, there are several examples from Scandinavia in which an Old Norse word that is a designation of status has become a personal name. In the inscription, each word in the runic text is separated with a punctuation mark consisting of two dots except for the name Drengr, which has been emphasized by using a different word divider consisting of a single dot.

The Rundata catalog number for this stone, Ög MÖLM1960;230, refers to the year and page number of the 1960–61 edition of Meddelanden från Östergötlands ocb Linköpings stads Museum where the inscription was first described.

== Inscription ==
...---a : oliʀ : ristu : stin : þins- : (i)f(t)iʀ * (t)rik * (a)ukis : sun : kilta : sin :
... {} Alveʀ/Ølveʀ {} ræistu {} stæin {} þenns[a] {} æftiʀ {} Dræng, {} Øygæiʀs(?) {} sun, {} gilda {} sinn. {}
... Ǫlvir raised this stone in memory of Drengr, Eygeirr's(?) son, his guild-brother.
