= Södermanland Runic Inscription 351 =

Coordinates: 59.0873°N 17.5659°E

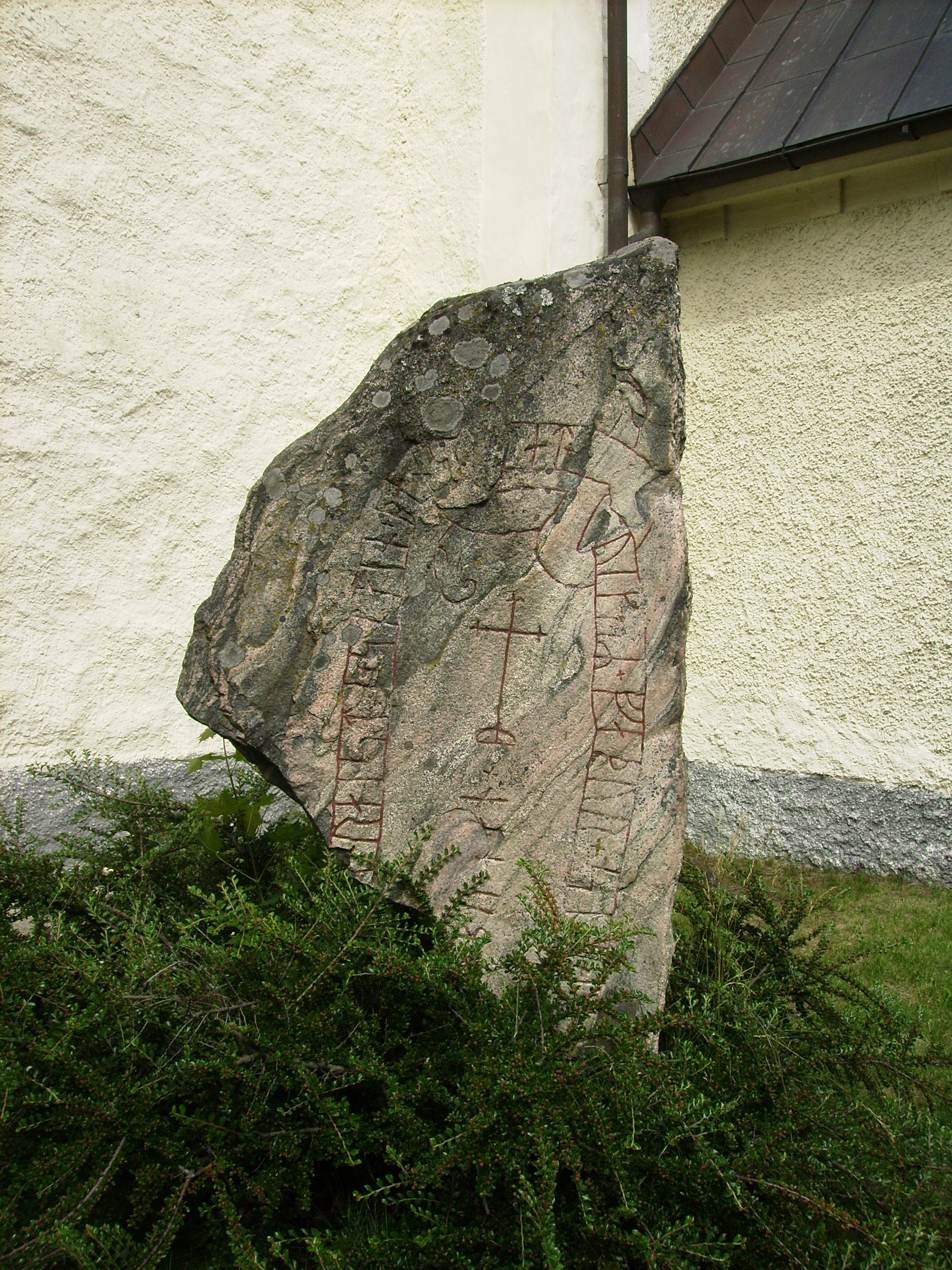
Sö 351 in Överjärna.

Södermanland Runic Inscription 351 or Sö 351 is the Rundata catalog number of a Viking Age memorial runestone located in Överjärna, which is part of Järna, Stockholm County, Sweden, which was part of the historic province of Södermanland. The damaged inscription depicts a ship and the text names the killer of the decedent.

== Description ==
This damaged inscription consists of text in the younger futhark carved on a serpent that circles a cross and ship which is on a granite stone that is 1.22 meters in height. Other runic inscriptions from the Viking Age which depict ships include DR 77 in Hjermind, DR 119 in Spentrup, DR 220 in Sønder Kirkeby, DR 258 in Bösarp, DR 271 in Tullstorp, DR 328 in Holmby, DR EM85;523 in Farsø, Ög 181 in Ledberg, Ög 224 in Stratomta, Ög MÖLM1960;230 in Törnevalla, Sö 122 in Skresta, Sö 154 in Skarpåker, Sö 158 in Österberga, Sö 164 in Spånga, Sö 352 in Linga, Vg 51 in Husaby, U 370 in Herresta, U 979 in Gamla Uppsala, U 1052 in Axlunda, U 1161 in Altuna, and Vs 17 in Råby. Three stones, the Hørdum and Långtora kyrka stones and U 1001 in Rasbo, depict ships but currently do not have any runes on them and may never have had any. Based on stylistic analysis, it is believed that the same runemaster who carved Sö 351 also carved the nearby inscriptions on Sö 350 in Valsta and Sö 352 in Linga.

The runic text indicates that the stone was raised in memory of a man named Végeirr, who was the father of the sponsor of the inscription. It states the name of the killer of Végeirr, a man named Wends. It is one of two runestones which name the killers of the decedent by name, the other being the now-lost U 954 in Söderby.

== Inscription ==
=== Transliteration of the runes into Latin characters ===
...[u] + raisti + stain + þansi + at + uikaiʀ + faþur + sin + uinr ...abu + h-n ×

=== Transcription into Old Norse ===
... ræisti stæin þannsi at Vigæiʀ, faður sinn. Vindr [dr]apu h[a]nn.

=== Translation in English ===
... raised this stone in memory of Végeirr, his father. Wends killed him.
