= Skarpåker Stone =

Viking Age memorial runestone

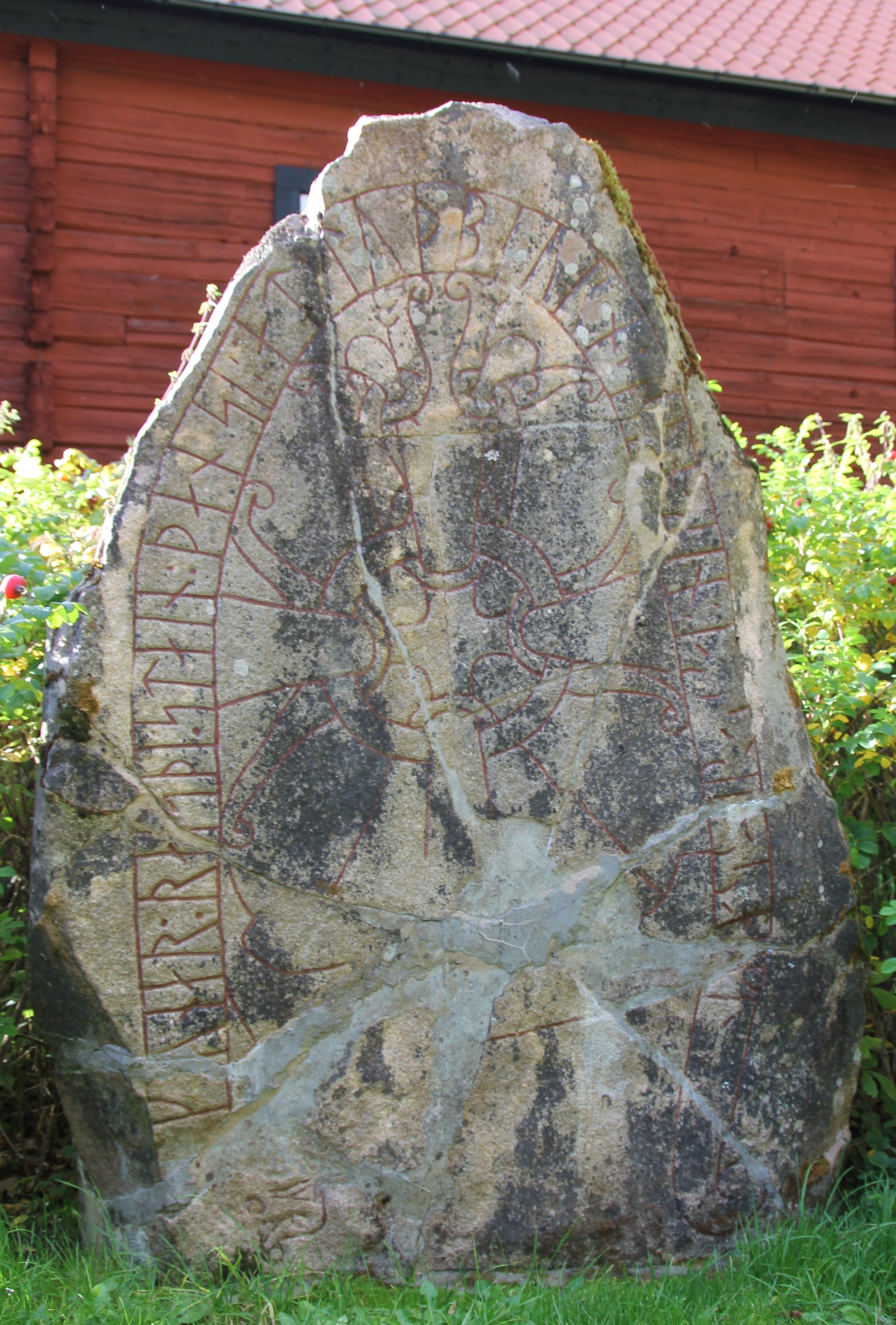
- Created: early Eleventh Century
- Discovered: 1883 AD; Lindö, Sörmland, Sweden
- Rundata ID: Sö 154
- Runemaster: unknown

The Skarpåker Stone, designated by Rundata as Sö 154, is a Viking Age memorial runestone that originally was located in Skarpåker, Nyköping, Sörmland, Sweden. It dates to the early eleventh century.

== Description ==
The runestone was discovered in 1883 in a field at Skarpåker, but in 1883 was moved to Lindö and then moved to its current location in that city in 1928. The Skarpåker Stone is 1.8 meters in height and notable for a skaldic younger futhark inscription in two, nearly-identical lines. The eschatology of the verse, "the Earth shall be rent, and the heavens above", apparently expressing a father's devastation at the loss of his son, may be compared to the father's lament in the Sonatorrek. It also evokes the catastrophic end of the world in Germanic mythology, described in the Poetic Edda as Ragnarök and also alluded to in the Muspilli.

The phrase "heavens above" or "high heaven" (literally "up-heaven") is used in three existing skaldic poems, in Old High German, Old Saxon and Old English religious poetry, as well as on the charm on the Ribe runic healing stick DR EM85;493, with "earth and high heaven" apparently a common Germanic poetic phrase. The line on the Skarpåker Stone also invokes the following lines from the third stanza of the Völuspá:

Of old was the age | when Ymir lived;
Sea nor cool waves | nor sand there were;
Earth had not been, | nor heaven above,
But a yawning gap, | and grass nowhere.

The text is carved on a serpent who arches over a depiction of a ship with a cross as its mast. Other runic inscriptions from the Viking Age that depict ships include DR 77 in Hjermind, DR 119 in Spentrup, DR 220 in Sønder Kirkeby, DR 258 in Bösarp, DR 271 in Tullstorp, DR 328 in Holmby, DR EM85;523 in Farsø, Ög 181 in Ledberg, Ög 224 in Stratomta, Ög MÖLM1960;230 in Törnevalla, Sö 122 in Skresta, Sö 158 in Österberga, Sö 164 in Spånga, Sö 351 in Överjärna, Sö 352 in Linga, Vg 51 in Husaby, U 370 in Herresta, U 979 in Gamla Uppsala, U 1052 in Axlunda, U 1161 in Altuna, and Vs 17 in Råby. Three stones, the Hørdum and Långtora kyrka stones and U 1001 in Rasbo, depict ships, but currently do not have any runes on them, and may never have had any. While including older pagan references in the runic text, the overall theme of the inscription on the Skarpåker Stone, with the ship and cross, is Christian.

The inscription on the Skarpåker Stone has been attributed to a runemaster named Traen, and is classified as being carved in runestone style Pr1, which also is known as the Ringerike style. This is the classification for inscriptions with runic text bands that end in serpent or animal heads, depicted as seen from above.

== Transliteration of inscription into Latin letters ==
kunar : raisþi : stain : þansi : at lyþbiurn : sun : sin : iarþsalr ifna uk ubhimin
Gunnarr {} reisti {} stein {} þenna {} at Lýðbjǫrn, {} son {} sinn. {} Jarðsalr hifna ok upphiminn
Gunnarr raised this stone in memory of Lyðbjǫrn, his son. The earthly hall of Heaven and High Heaven.

kunar : raisþi : stain : þansi : at lyþbiurn : sun : sin : iarþ sal rifna uk ubhimin
Gunnarr {} reisti {} stein {} þenna {} at Lyðbjǫrn, {} son {} sinn. {} Jarð sal rifna ok upphiminn
Gunnarr raised this stone in memory of Lyðbjǫrn, his son. Earth shall be riven and High Heaven.
