= Västmanland Runic Inscription 17 =

Viking age memorial runestone

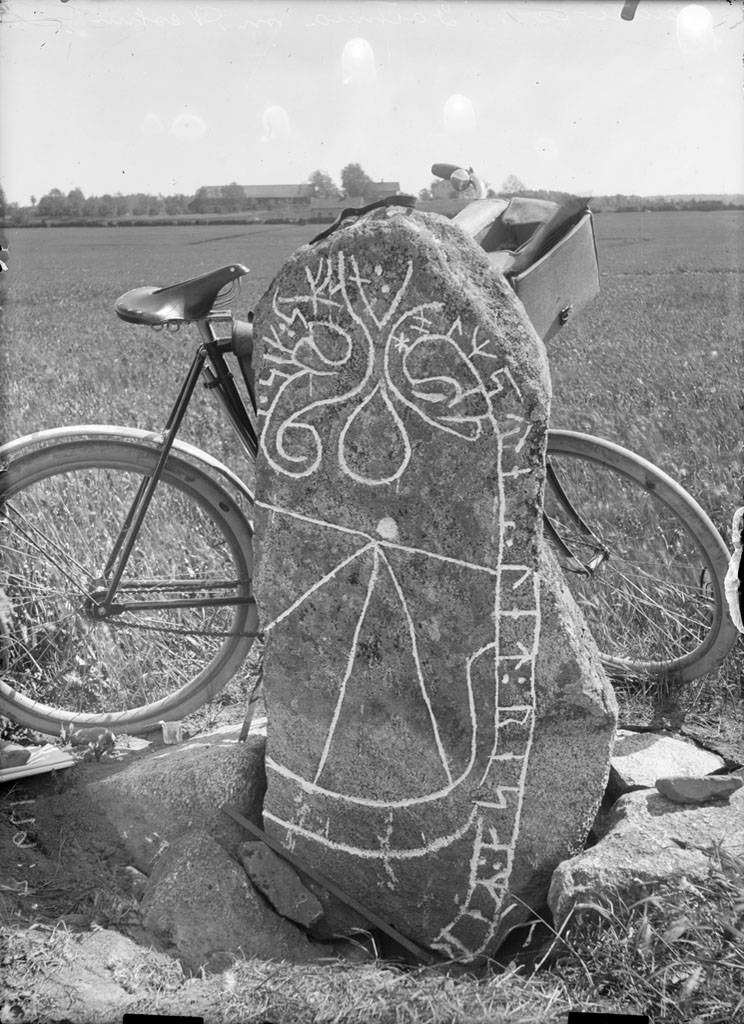
Photograph of Vs 17 and a bicycle taken around 1900.

Västmanland Runic Inscription 17 or Vs 17 is the Rundata designation for a Viking Age memorial runestone with an image of a ship that is located in Råby, which is about two kilometers east of Tortuna, Västmanland County, Sweden, which was in the historic province of Västmanland.

== Description ==
The inscription on Vs 17 consists of runic text in the younger futhark on a serpent that encircles a ship that is on a granite stone which is 1.4 meters in height. Other runic inscriptions from the Viking Age which depict ships include DR 77 in Hjermind, DR 119 in Spentrup, DR 220 in Sønder Kirkeby, DR 258 in Bösarp, DR 271 in Tullstorp, DR 328 in Holmby, DR EM85;523 in Farsø, Ög 181 in Ledberg, Ög 224 in Stratomta, Ög MÖLM1960;230 in Törnevalla, Sö 122 in Skresta, Sö 154 in Skarpåker, Sö 158 in Österberga, Sö 164 in Spånga, Sö 351 in Överjärna, Sö 352 in Linga, Vg 51 in Husaby, U 370 in Herresta, U 979 in Gamla Uppsala, U 1052 in Axlunda, and U 1161 in Altuna. Three stones, the Hørdum and Långtora kyrka stones and U 1001 in Rasbo, depict ships but currently do not have any runes on them and may never have had any.

The inscription, which has been damaged on the left side, is classified as probably being carved in runestone style Pr5, which is also known as Urnes style. This runestone style is characterized by slim and stylized animals that are interwoven into tight patterns. The animal heads are typically seen in profile with slender almond-shaped eyes and upwardly curled appendages on the noses and the necks. The inscription based on stylistic analysis is attributed to a runemaster with the normalized name of Litle, who signed the inscriptions on runestones Vs 20 in Prästgården (Romfartuna synod), Vs 27 in Grällsta, and probably the now-lost Vs 28 in Grällsta. Other inscriptions attributed to Litle based on stylistic analysis include Vs 22 in Ulvsta and Vs 32 in Prästgården (Västerfärnebo synod).

The runic text indicates that the stone was raised by Holmsteinn in memory of his wife Tíðfríðr and of himself. There are over twenty other runestones where the sponsor of the stone stated that the stone was raised in memory of himself, including Sö 55 in Bjudby, U 127 in Danderyds, the now-lost U 149 in Hagby, U 164 and U 165 in Täby, U 171 in Söderby, U 194 in Väsby, U 212 in Vallentuna, U 261 in Fresta, U 308 in Ekeby, the now-lost U 345 in Yttergärde, U 433 in Husby-Ärlinghundra, U 734 in Linsunda, U 739 in Gådi, U 803 in Långtora, U 962 in Vaksala, U 1011 in Örby, U 1040 in Fasma, the now-lost U 1114 in Myrby, U 1181 in Lilla Runhällen, U Fv1958;250 in Sigtuna, Vs 32 in Prästgården, and DR 212 in Tillitse. Of these, five stones known as the Jarlabanke Runestones were sponsored by the same person in memory of himself. In carving the runic text, the runemaster used a punctuation mark consisting of two dots as a word divider between each word.

== Inscription ==
=== Transliteration of the runes into Latin characters ===
holmste[n] : let : resa : mer[ki : eftir : tifrit : gonu : sina : ok : iftir] : sik : selfan :

=== Transcription into Old Norse ===
Holmstæinn let ræisa mærki æftiR Tiðfrið, konu sina, ok æftiʀ sik sialfan.

=== Translation in English ===
Holmsteinn had the landmark raised in memory of Tíðfríðr, his wife, and in memory of himself.
