= Uppland Runic Inscription 979 =

Coordinates: 59°53′59″N 17°37′54″E

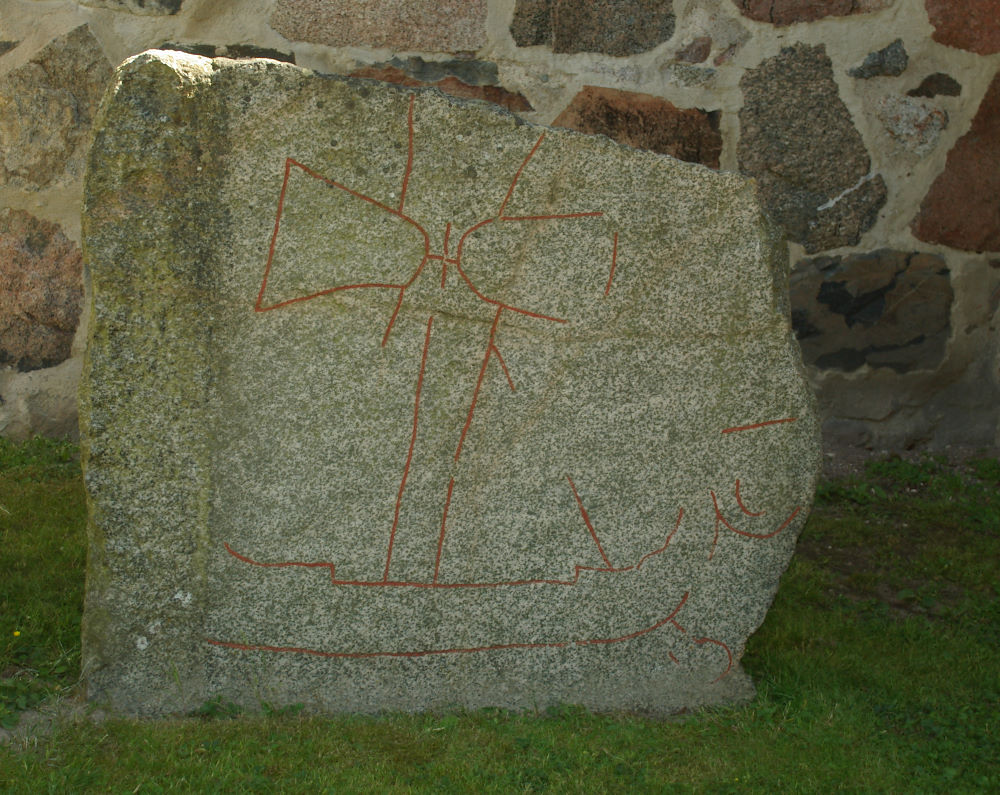
U 979 from Gamla Uppsala.

Uppland Runic Inscription 979 or U 979 is the Rundata designation for a Viking Age runestone located at Gamla Uppsala, Sweden, which depicts a ship.

== Description ==
U 979 is a damaged runestone located near the north entrance to the church at Gamla Uppsala. The inscription on the stone, which is 1.3 meters in height, depicts a ship with a cross for a mast, but does not have any readable runes remaining on the surviving portion. This ship motif was used on several other memorial runestones in Sweden apparently in reference to the voyage of a Christian's soul to the afterlife. Other Scandinavian runic inscriptions from the Viking Age which depict ships include DR 77 in Hjermind, DR 119 in Spentrup, DR 220 in Sønder Kirkeby, DR 258 in Bösarp, DR 271 in Tullstorp, DR 328 in Holmby, DR EM85;523 in Farsø, Ög 181 in Ledberg, Ög 224 in Stratomta, Ög MÖLM1960;230 in Törnevalla, Sö 122 in Skresta, Sö 154 in Skarpåker, Sö 158 in Österberga, Sö 164 in Spånga, Sö 351 in Överjärna, Sö 352 in Linga, Vg 51 in Husaby, U 370 in Herresta, U 1052 in Axlunda, and Vs 17 in Råby. Three other stones, the Hørdum and Långtora kyrka stones and U 1001 in Rasbo, depict ships but currently do not have any runes on them and may never have had any.

== See also ==
- List of runestones
