= Östergötland Runic Inscription 224 =

Runestone in Östergötland, Sweden

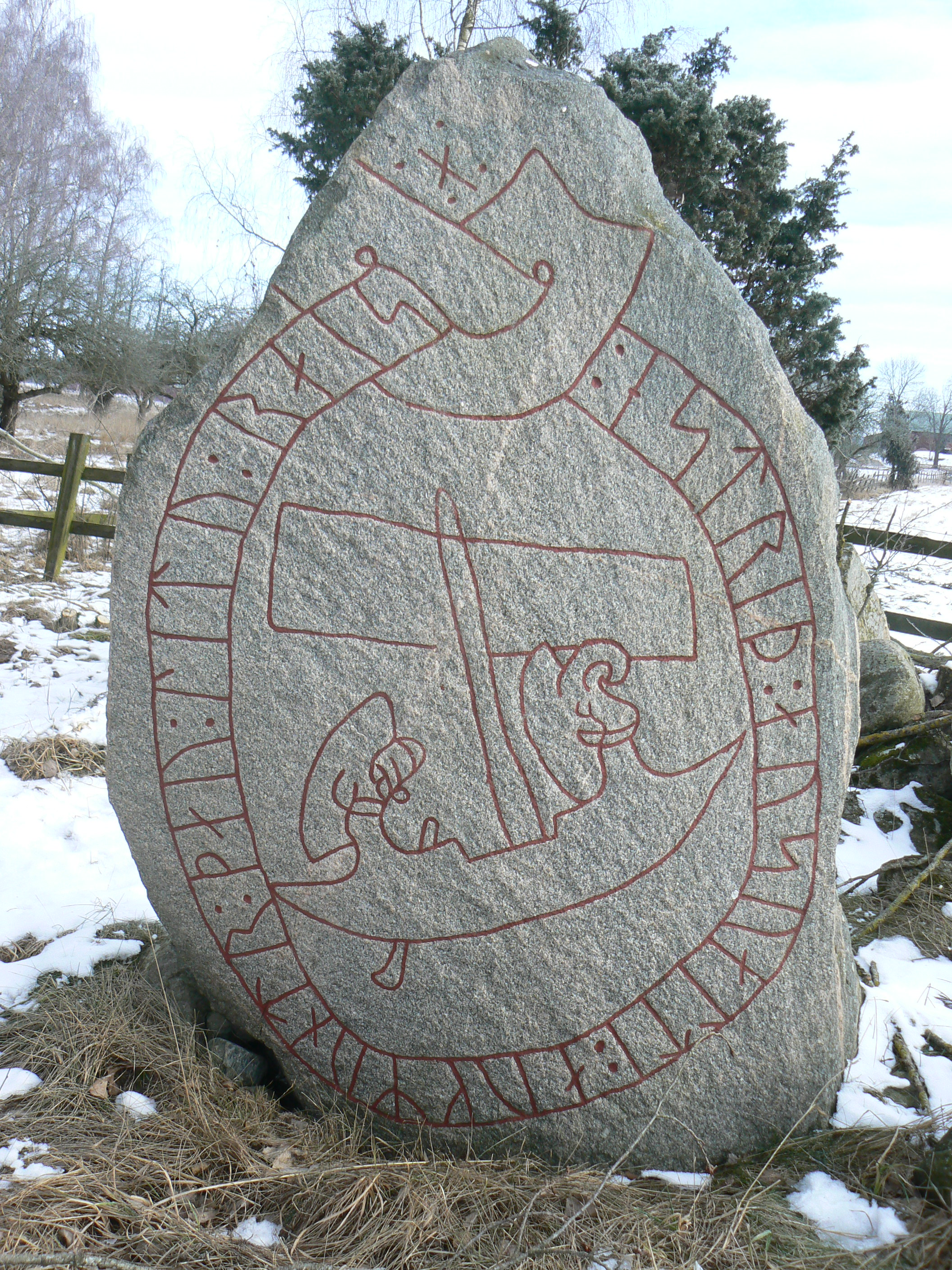
The south side of inscription Ög 224

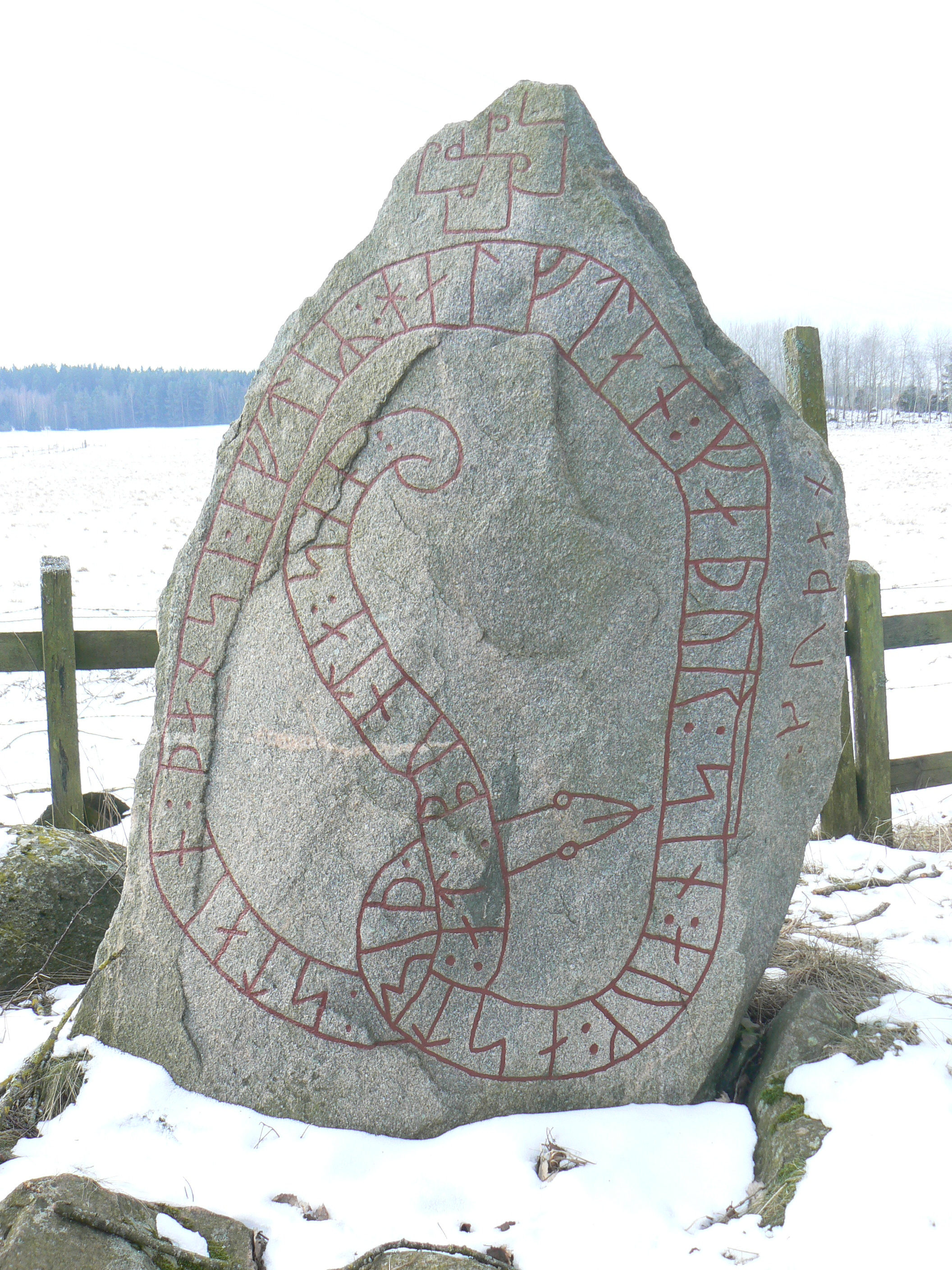
The north side of inscription Ög 224

Östergötland Runic Inscription 224 or Ög 224 is the Rundata catalog number for a Viking Age memorial runestone that is located in Stratomta, 9 kilometers (5.6 mi) east of Linköping, Östergötland, Sweden. The runestone has an inscription on two sides with an image of a ship on the south side.

== Description ==
This runic inscription is carved on two sides of a stone that is 1.7 meters (5 ft 7 in) in height. On one side, which faces south, the inscription consists of text in the Younger Futhark within a band that circles an image of a ship. On the side that faces north, the inscription consists of text within a serpent. At the top on this side is a stylized Christian cross. Because of the depiction on the north side, the inscription is classified as being carved in runestone style Fp, which is the classification for inscriptions where the text bands end in serpent or beast heads depicted as seen from above.

Ship images appear on several Viking Age runic inscriptions. Other runic inscriptions from the Viking Age which depict ships include DR 77 in Hjermind, DR 119 in Spentrup, DR 220 in Sønder Kirkeby, DR 258 in Bösarp, DR 271 in Tullstorp, DR 328 in Holmby, DR EM85;523 in Farsø, Ög 181 in Ledberg, Ög MÖLM1960;230 in Törnevalla, Sö 122 in Skresta, Sö 154 in Skarpåker, Sö 158 in Österberga, Sö 164 in Spånga, Sö 351 in Överjärna, Sö 352 in Linga, Vg 51 in Husaby, U 370 in Herresta, U 979 in Gamla Uppsala, U 1052 in Axlunda, U 1161 in Altuna, and Vs 17 in Råby. Three stones, the Hørdum and Långtora kyrka stones and U 1001 in Rasbo, depict ships but currently do not have any runes on them and may never have had any.

The runic text, which starts on the south side of the stone and is designated in Rundata as line A, states that the runestone was raised as a memorial by Ástríðr, Ásvaldi, and Augmundr in memory of their father Halfdan, and by Ástríðr in memory of her "good husbandman." The south side has line B of the text and the last rune on the final word, an a-rune, is located at the top of the inscription. The last word of the inscription, kuþan or goðan ("good"), was placed on the east side of the stone and is designated as line C.

== Inscription ==
=== Transliteration of the runes into Latin characters ===
§A : estriþ : ausualti : aukmuntr : þau : litu : rais:a
§B : stain : þansi : aftiʀ : halftan : faþur : sin : auk : astriþ : at : bunta : sin :
§C : kuþan :

=== Transcription into Old Norse ===
§A Æstrið, Asvaldi, Augmundr, þau letu ræisa
§B stæin þannsi æftiʀ Halfdan, faður sinn, ok Æstrið at bonda sinn
§C goðan.

=== Translation in English ===
§A Ástríðr, Ásvaldi, Augmundr, they had
§B this stone raised in memory of Halfdan, their father; and Ástríðr in memory of her good husbandman.

or more similar to the original text:

§A Æstrið, Asvaldi, Augmundr, they let raise
§B stone this after Halfdan, father theirs, and Æstrið for bonda theirs
§C good

== Drawings ==
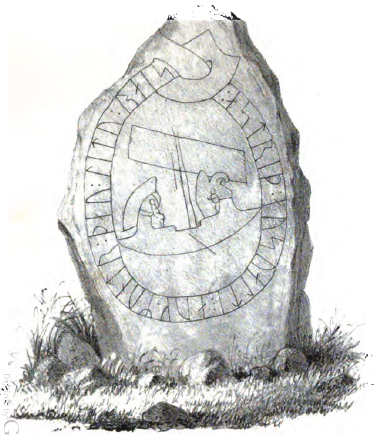
South side drawing published in 1857

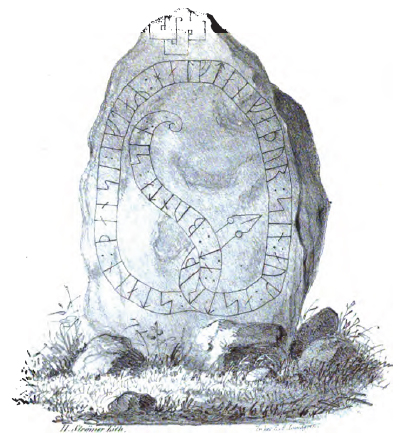
North side drawing published in 1857
