= Södermanland Runic Inscription 158 =

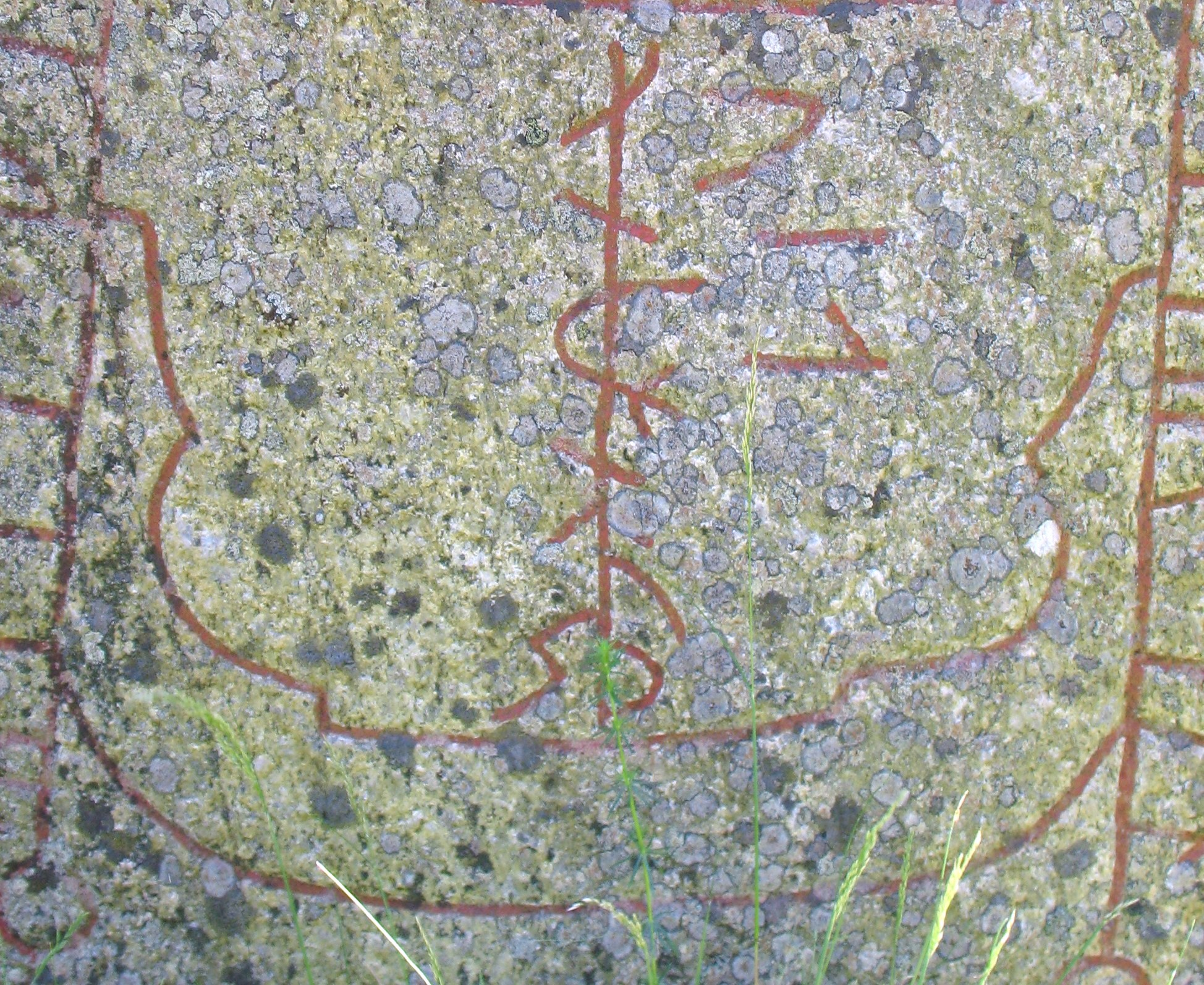
Detail on Sö 158 showing ship image with same-stave bind runes along the mast.

Södermanland Runic Inscription 158 or Sö 158 is the Rundata catalog number for a Viking Age memorial runestone located in Österberga, which is one kilometer southwest of Ärsta and three kilometers southwest of Runtuna, Södermanland County, Sweden, and in the historic province of Södermanland. The inscription includes an image of a ship and uses same-stave bind runes to commemorate a man described as being a thegn.

== Description ==
This runestone was initially noted during the Swedish surveys of runestones in the late 17th century, and a drawing of the inscription made by Johan Göransson was published under the name Bautil in 1750. The runestone was then lost, but was rediscovered in 1951 near a farmhouse by Claes Widén and moved to its current location in 1984. The stone is made of granite and is 1.6 meters in height. The runic inscription consists of runic text carved on a serpent which arches over the image of a ship. Other runic inscriptions from the Viking Age which depict ships include DR 77 in Hjermind, DR 119 in Spentrup, DR 220 in Sønder Kirkeby, DR 258 in Bösarp, DR 271 in Tullstorp, DR 328 in Holmby, DR EM85;523 in Farsø, Ög 181 in Ledberg, Ög 224 in Stratomta, Ög MÖLM1960;230 in Törnevalla, Sö 122 in Skresta, Sö 154 in Skarpåker, Sö 164 in Spånga, Sö 351 in Överjärna, Sö 352 in Linga, Vg 51 in Husaby, U 370 in Herresta, U 979 in Gamla Uppsala, U 1052 in Axlunda, U 1161 in Altuna, and Vs 17 in Råby. Three stones, the Hørdum and Långtora kyrka stones and U 1001 in Rasbo, depict ships but currently do not have any runes on them and may never have had any. The inscription is classified as being carved in runestone style Fp, which is the classification for runic bands that end in serpent heads depicted as seen from above.

The runic text is in the younger futhark and indicates that the stone was raised by two sons in memory of their father Ketilhôfði, who is described as being þróttar þegn or a thegn of strength, using bind runes carved along the mast of the ship. A thegn was a class of retainer in Scandinavia. A bind rune is a ligature that combines one or more runes into a single rune. Because the runes are vertically separated along a common stave, runologists further classify these bind runes as being same-stave runes. The runes for the phrase þróttar þegn, which supplement the main runic text, þ=r=u=t=a=ʀ= =þ=i=a=k=n, are carved along the mast, and alternate on each side of the mast reading from the bottom. A similar design with same-stave bindrunes along the base of a cross that forms the mast of a ship which is surrounded by a serpent is on inscription Sö 352 in Linga. It is believed that the same runemaster carved both Sö 158 and Sö 352. The phrase þróttar þegn is used on six other runestones, Sö 90 in Lövhulta, Sö 112 in Kolunda, Sö 151 in Lövsund, and Sö 170 in Nälberga, and, in its plural form on Sö 367 in Släbro and Sö Fv1948;295 in Prästgården. To the right of the mast are three runes uit whose interpretation is unknown, but it has been suggested that they be translated as an imperative vit meaning "know" or "take seriously." Other runestones with similar imperative exclamations in their runic texts include U 29 at Hillersjö and U 328 at Stora Lundby.

== Inscription ==
=== Transliteration of the runes into Latin characters ===
: baki : fulk(s)tin þiʀ : raisþu : stin : þan:si : at : faþur : sin kitilhafþa þ=r=u=t=a=ʀ= =þ=i=a=k=n uit

=== Transcription into Old Norse ===
Banki/Baggi, Folksteinn, þeir reistu stein þenna at fôður sinn Ketilhôfða, þróttar þegn <uit>.

=== Translation in English ===
Banki/Baggi (and) Folksteinn, they raised this stone in memory of their father Ketilhôfði, a Þegn of strength. ...
