= Södermanland Runic Inscription 352 =

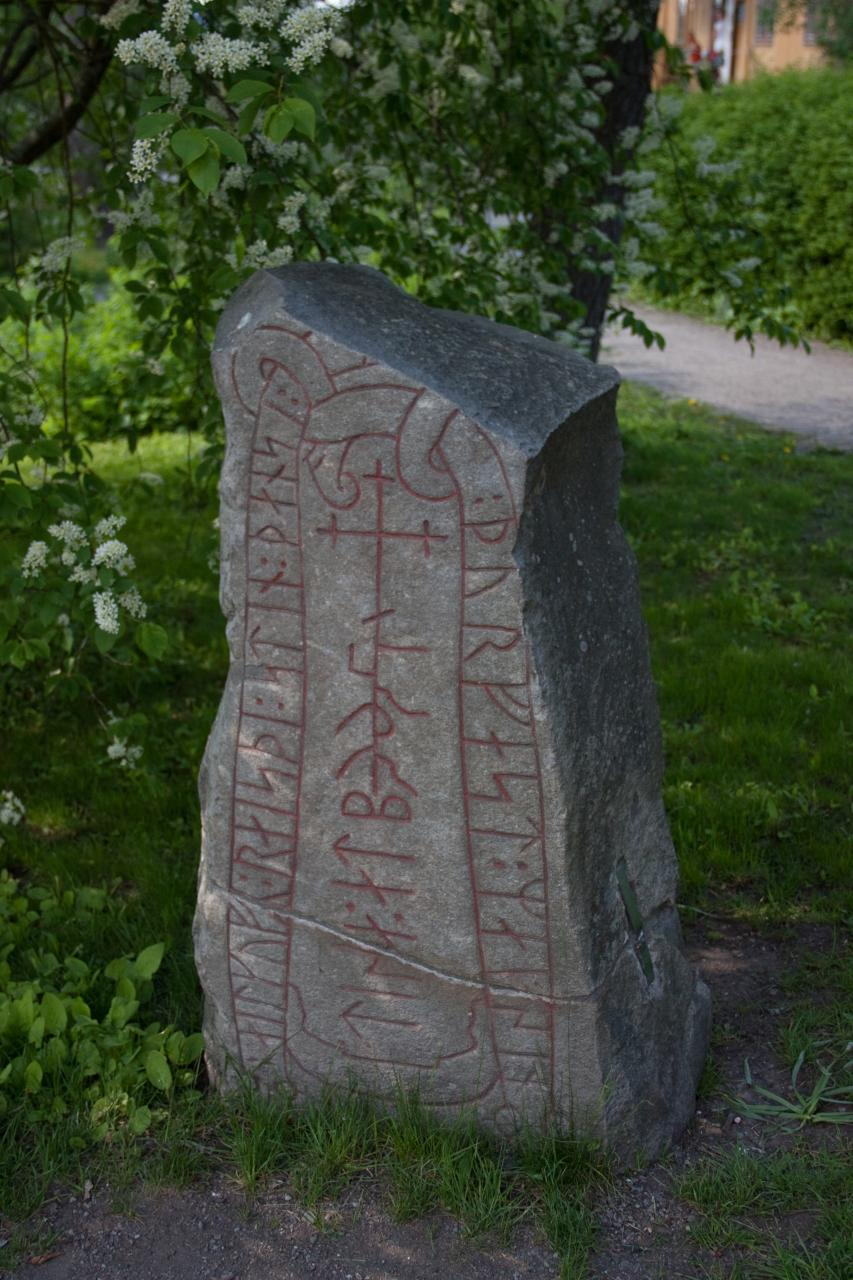
Sö 352 uses same-stave bind runes in its text.

Södermanland Runic Inscription 352 or Sö 352 is a Viking Age memorial runestone located at Linga, which is about two kilometers south of Järna, Stockholm County, Sweden, which was in the historic province of Södermanland. The inscription depicts a ship with an anchor and a portion of the runic text uses same-stave bind runes on the ship mast.

== Description ==
This inscription consists of runic text carved on two serpents that bracket the image of ship, whose upper mast forms a Christian cross, with the text continued on the top and back of the stone. The inscription is classified as being carved in runestone style Fp, which is the classification for runic bands that end in serpent heads depicted as seen from above. A runestone with a similar design is Sö 158 in Österberga, and it is believed that the same runemaster carved both Sö 158 and Sö 352 along with the nearby inscriptions Sö 350 at Valsta and Sö 351 in Överjärna.

Ship images appear on several Viking Age runic inscriptions, but the image on Sö 352 is unusual in that it apparently depicts a rope and anchor below the ship. The anchor does not appear to be made of iron, which was used only in the larger, more expensive ships, but is either a stone or made of stone and wood with rope lashings. Other runic inscriptions from the Viking Age which depict ships include DR 77 in Hjermind, DR 119 in Spentrup, DR 220 in Sønder Kirkeby, DR 258 in Bösarp, DR 271 in Tullstorp, DR 328 in Holmby, DR EM85;523 in Farsø, Ög 181 in Ledberg, Ög 224 in Stratomta, Ög MÖLM1960;230 in Törnevalla, Sö 122 in Skresta, Sö 154 in Skarpåker, Sö 158 in Österberga, Sö 164 in Spånga, Sö 351 in Överjärna, Vg 51 in Husaby, U 370 in Herresta, U 979 in Gamla Uppsala, U 1052 in Axlunda, U 1161 in Altuna, and Vs 17 in Råby. Three stones, the Hørdum and Långtora kyrka stones and U 1001 in Rasbo, depict ships but currently do not have any runes on them and may never have had any.

The runic text is in the younger futhark and states that the stone was raised by Helgulfr as a memorial to his kinsman by marriage named Þorfastr, and by Dísa, who was the sister of Þorfastr. The runes [b]ruþur sin meaning "her brother" are carved along the mast of the ship under the cross using bind runes. A bind rune is a ligature that combines one or more runes into a single rune. Because the runes are vertically separated along a common stave, runologists further classify these bind runes as being same-stave runes. The use of these runes here is considered to have been ornamental. Although the stone is considered to be Christian due to the cross and ship imagery, two of the names in the text have theophoric name elements, with Þorfastr referring to the Norse paganism Norse pagan god Thor and Dísa a nickname related to Dís, which refers to a protective female deity.

== Inscription ==
Line A is on the front side of the stone with the serpent and ship images, line B is on the top, and line C is on the back.

=== Transliteration of the runes into Latin characters ===
A : ailkufʀ : raisþi : stin : þansi : [at] : þurfast : mag : sin : tisa : at bruþur sin ... [<-rþ>u]
B [tuþr uu...]
C tisa : kiarþ... eft... ... sina

=== Transcription into Old Norse ===
A Hælgulfʀ(?) ræisti stæin þannsi at Þorfast, mag sinn, Disa at broður sinn. ... urðu(?)
B dauðr(?) ...
C Disa gærð[i] æft[iʀ] ... sina.

=== Translation in English ===
A Helgulfr(?) raised this stone in memory of Þorfastr, his kinsman-by-marriage; Dísa in memory of her brother. ... ...
B died(?) ...
C Dísa made in memory of ... her.
