= Hørdum stone =

Viking Age picture stone

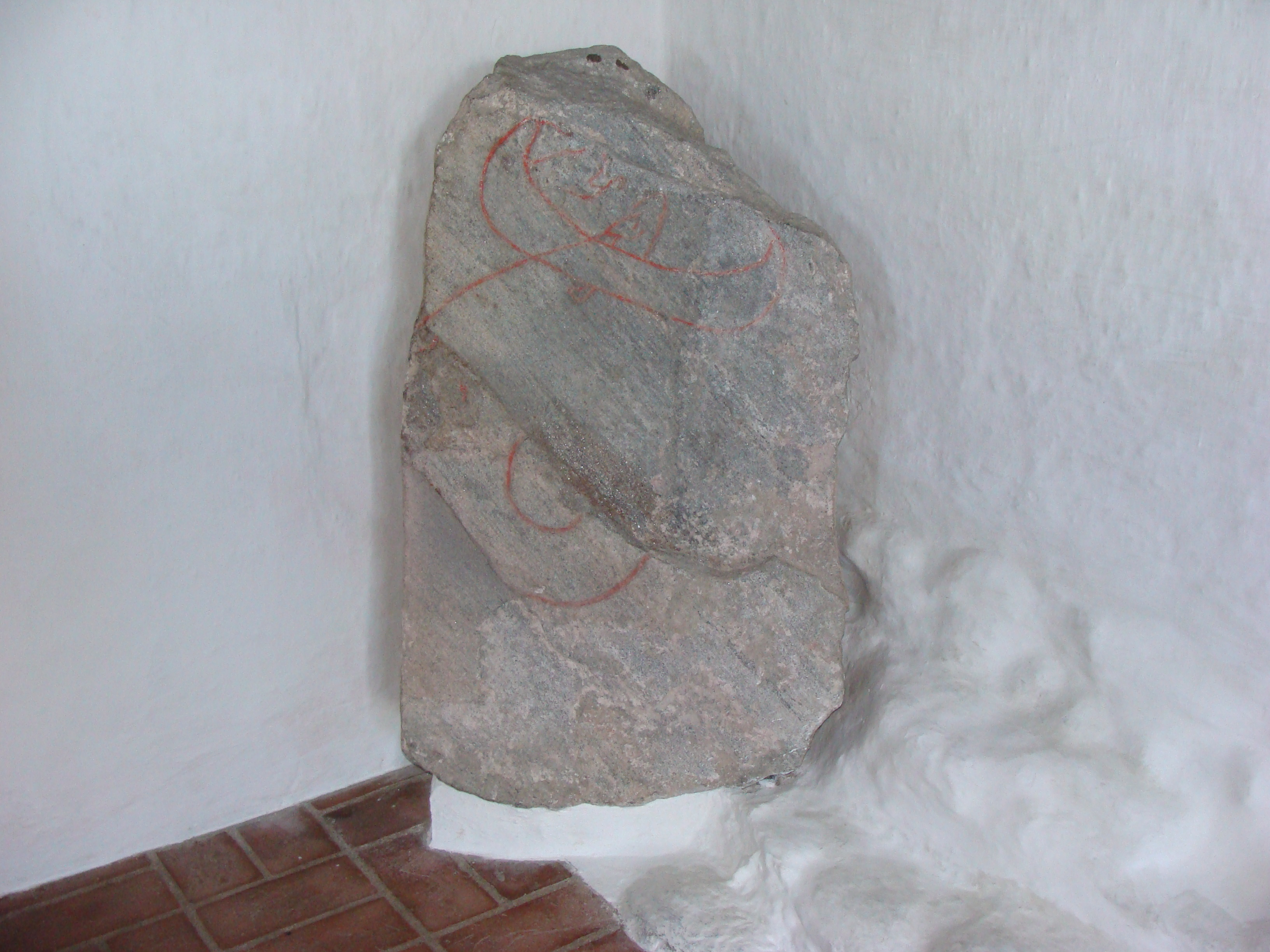
Hørdum stone

The Hørdum stone is a Viking Age picture stone discovered in Hørdum, Thisted Municipality, North Denmark Region, Denmark, that depicts a legend from Norse mythology involving the god Thor and Jörmungandr, the Midgard serpent.

== Description ==
The Hørdum stone was discovered in 1954 during trench work adjacent to the church in Hørdum. Before the historical significance of runestones and picture stones was understood, they were often reused as materials in the construction of roads, bridges, walls, and buildings. The image on the stone illustrates a legend recorded in the Hymiskviða of the Poetic Edda, in which the Norse god Thor fishes for Jörmungandr, the Midgard serpent. Thor goes fishing with the jötunn Hymir using an ox head for bait, and catches Jörmungandr, who then either breaks loose or, as told in the Gylfaginning of the Prose Edda, the line is cut loose by Hymir. The Prose Edda provides the additional detail that while Thor was pulling on the line with Jörmungandr on the hook, his feet went through the bottom of the boat. The image on the Hørdum stone shows Hymir, Thor, his fishing line and a portion of the serpent. Thor's foot has been pushed through the hull of the boat. The ox head bait is not shown, but may have been on a section of the image that has been worn away. Hymir is depicted holding a tool, apparently in preparation to cut the fishing line, consistent with the version of the myth told in the Gylfaginning. It has also been suggested that an image of the head of the serpent can be seen in the natural fracture edges of the stone under the boat.

This encounter between Thor and Jörmungandr seems to have been one of the most popular motifs in Norse art. Three other picture stones that have been linked with the myth are the Ardre VIII image stone, the Altuna Runestone, and the Gosforth Cross. A stone slab that may be a portion of a second cross at Gosforth also shows a fishing scene using an ox head for bait. Several other Scandinavian runic inscriptions from the Viking Age depict ships but not this myth, including DR 77 in Hjermind, DR 119 in Spentrup, DR 220 in Sønder Kirkeby, DR 258 in Bösarp, DR 271 in Tullstorp, DR 328 in Holmby, DR EM85;523 in Farsø, Ög 181 in Ledberg, Ög 224 in Stratomta, Ög MÖLM1960;230 in Törnevalla, Sö 122 in Skresta, Sö 154 in Skarpåker, Sö 158 in Österberga, Sö 164 in Spånga, Sö 351 in Överjärna, Sö 352 in Linga, Vg 51 in Husaby, U 370 in Herresta, U 979 in Gamla Uppsala, U 1052 in Axlunda, and Vs 17 in Råby. Two other stones, the Långtora kyrka stone and U 1001 in Rasbo, depict ships but currently do not have any runes on them and may never have had any.

The Hørdum stone is currently on display in the church in Hørdum.
