= Västmanland Runic Inscription 22 =

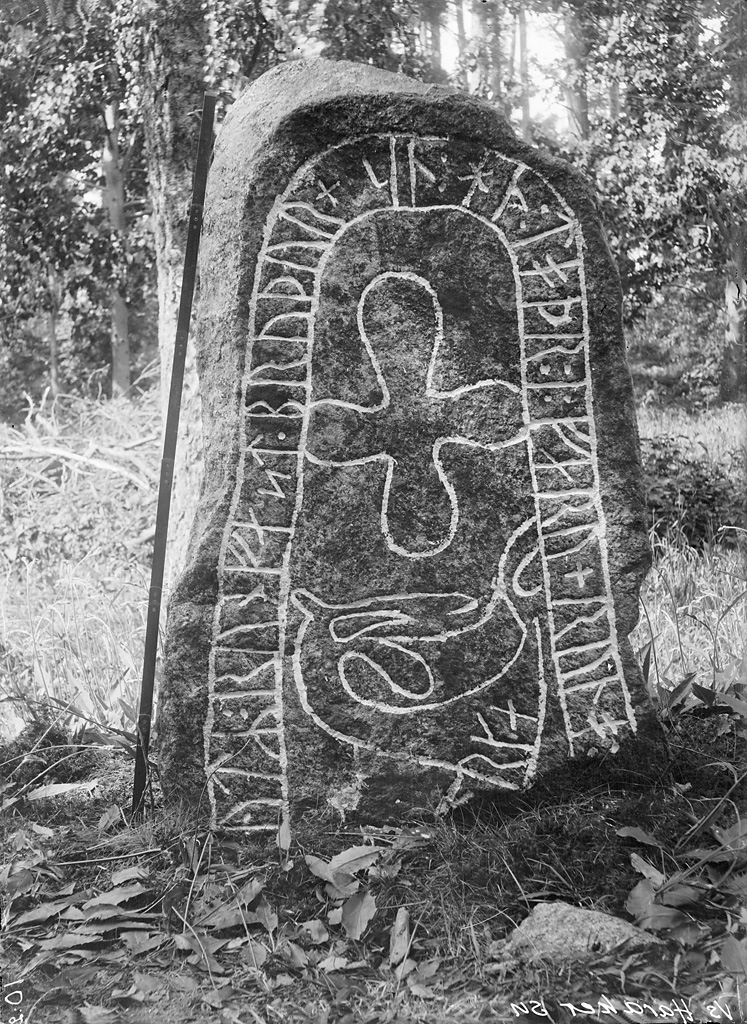
Photograph of Vs 22 in 1898.

Västmanland Runic Inscription 22 or Vs 22 is the Rundata designation for a Viking Age memorial runestone that was originally located at Ulvsta, but has been moved to Svana, which is about seven kilometers north of Skultuna, Västmanland County, Sweden, and which was in the historic province of Västmanland.

== Description ==
The inscription on Vs 22 consists of runic text in the younger futhark on a serpent that encloses a central cross, with the head of the serpent below the cross. The inscription, which is 0.95 meters in height and on a granite stone, is classified as probably being carved in runestone style Pr3, which is also known as Urnes style. The uncertainty in the classification is due to the damaged ends of the runic text bands, which are used in the runestone classification system developed by Anne-Sophie Gräslund in the 1990s. In style Pr3, the ends of the runic bands have attached serpent heads depicted as seen in profile. Based on stylistic grounds, Vs 22 is attributed to a runemaster with the normalized name of Litle, who signed the inscriptions on inscription Vs 20 in Prästgården (Romfartuna synod), Vs 27 in Grällsta, and possibly the now-lost Vs 28 in Grällsta. Other inscriptions attributed to Litle based on stylistic analysis include Vs 17 in Råby and Vs 32 in Prästgården (Västerfärnebo synod). This stone was first noted during the runestone surveys in Sweden during the 1600s, and was moved to its current location at Svana near a stream by a man named von Friesen.

The runic text states that the stone was raised by a brother in memory of a man named Rúnfastr, who died on a voyage. From the word order, it is unclear if the voyage was for a man named Runi, or if Runa is a name starting a new sentence. At one time, it was suggested that Runa referred to an island in Estonia, but later scholars have dismissed this suggestion for lack of convincing evidence. That Runa is a personal name is supported by similar examples found on inscriptions such as the now-lost U 790 in Mälby, U 957 in Vedyxa, Sö 383 in Linga, and possibly U 1003 in Frötuna. The runemaster used a punctuation mark to separate each word of the text, and used a bind rune or ligature to combine the s-rune and i-rune in the word sinn. Vs 22 is the only inscription in Västmanland in which a bind rune was used.

The text indicates that Rúnfastr was among a band of drængia or "valiant men." A drengr in Denmark was a term mainly associated with members of a warrior group. It has been suggested that drengr along with thegn was first used as a title associated with men from Denmark and Sweden in service to Danish kings, but, from its context in inscriptions, over time became more generalized and was used by groups such as merchants or the crew of a ship. In the limited context of the damaged text on Vs 22, the brother of Rúnfastr may also have been part of the band on the voyage as a brother-in-arms. Other inscriptions involving a drengr and sponsorship by a brother who may have been part of the band include DR 77 in Hjermind, DR 387 in Vester Marie, Ög 104 in Gillberga, Ög 111 in Landeryds, Sö 320 in Stäringe, and Vg 184 in Smula. Vs 22 is also among a group of inscriptions making such a general statement of a non-local death, which include Sö 49 in Ene, Sö 217 in Berga, Sm 48 in Torp, U 258 in Fresta, the now-lost U 349 in Odenslunda, the now-lost U 363 in Gådersta, U 948 in Danmarks, Vs 27 in Grällsta, Nä 29 in Apelboda, DR 330 in Gårdstånga, and DR 379 in Ny Larsker. The text uses the term faru, which is translated as "voyage," which was used to describe campaigns to the east in comparison to a Viking voyage, which was to the west. Other stones using a version of the term faru include Sö 108 in Gredby and Sö 360 in Bjuddby.

== Inscription ==
=== Transliteration of the runes into Latin characters ===
... + ytʀ : runfast * bruþur + s=in : hn : toþr : i : faru + runo : ... (t)rka

=== Transcription into Old Norse ===
... æftiʀ Runfast, broður sinn. Hann [varð] dauðr i faru Runa ... drængia.

=== Translation in English ===
... in memory of Rúnfastr, his brother. He died on a voyage. Runa ... / He died on Runi's voyage ... of valiant men.
