= Holmby Runestone =

Viking Age memorial runestone

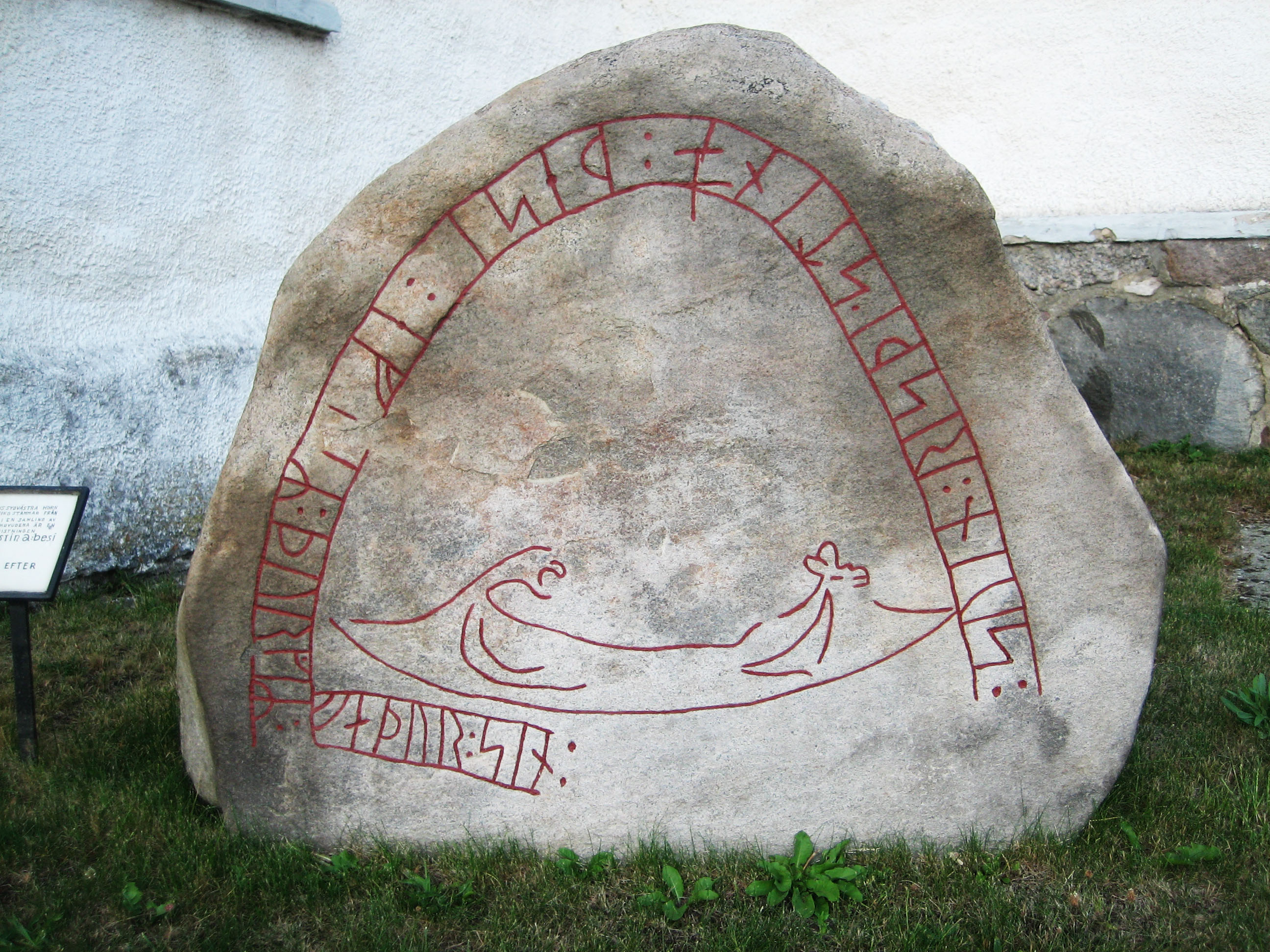
The Holmby Runestone, Scania, Sweden.

The Holmby Runestone, listed as DR 328 in the Rundata catalog, is a Viking Age memorial runestone bearing the image of a ship. It is in Holmby, which is about two kilometers southeast of Flyinge, Scania, Sweden.

== Description ==
The Holmby Runestone has an inscription that consists of runic text that is upside down in an arch that is over a depiction of a ship at sea. The stone is made of sandstone and is 1.11 meters in height. It was discovered in the wall of the southwest corner of a church tower around 1667. Before the historic nature of runestones was understood, they were often reused as construction materials for roads, bridges, and buildings. The stone was removed and raised outside the church in 1908. The inscription is classified as being carved in runestone style RAK, which is considered to be the oldest style. This classification is for inscriptions where the ends of the runic bands are straight and there are no attached serpent or beast heads. The inscription is dated as having been carved after the Jelling stones.

It has been pointed out that the image of the ship has an ancient form with beaks fore and aft, and thus may depict a symbolic ritual ship and not any known Viking Age ship type. Other inscriptions with similar features which may depict ancient, symbolic ships include DR 77 in Hjermind, DR 119 in Spentrup, DR 258 in Bösarp, and DR 271 in Tullstorps. Other runic inscriptions from the Viking Age which depict ships include DR 220 in Sønder Kirkeby, DR EM85;523 in Farsø, Ög 181 in Ledberg, Ög 224 in Stratomta, Ög MÖLM1960;230 in Törnevalla, Sö 122 in Skresta, Sö 154 in Skarpåker, Sö 158 in Österberga, Sö 164 in Spånga, Sö 351 in Överjärna, Sö 352 in Linga, Vg 51 in Husaby, U 370 in Herresta, U 979 in Gamla Uppsala, U 1052 in Axlunda, U 1161 in Altuna, and Vs 17 in Råby. Three stones, the Hørdum and Långtora kyrka stones and U 1001 in Rasbo, depict ships but currently do not have any runes on them and may never have had any.

The runic text states that the stone was raised as a memorial by a man named Sveinn to his father Þorgeirr. The name Þorgeirr contains as a theophoric name element the Norse pagan god Thor and means "Thor's Spear." The runic text uses the word stena meaning "stones," suggesting that more than one stone was originally raised in memory of Þorgeirr. If so, the second stone of the memorial has since been lost. The last words of the Old Norse text, faþur sin ("his father"), are carved below the image of the ship at sea.

Locally the stone is known as the Holmbystenen. The inscription has been given a Danish listing in the Rundata catalog as Scania was part of the historic Denmark.

== Inscription ==
=== Transliteration of the runes into Latin characters ===
: suin : risþi : stina ¶ + ¶ þesi : ef(t)iʀ : þurgiʀ : ¶ faþur : sin :

=== Transcription into Old Norse ===
Swen resþi stena þæssi æftiʀ Þorgiʀ, faþur sin.

=== Translation in English ===
Sveinn raised these stones in memory of Þorgeirr, his father.
