= Kyrkogården Runestones =

Viking memorial runestones in Stockholm County, Sweden

Coordinates: 59.6181°N 17.7230°E

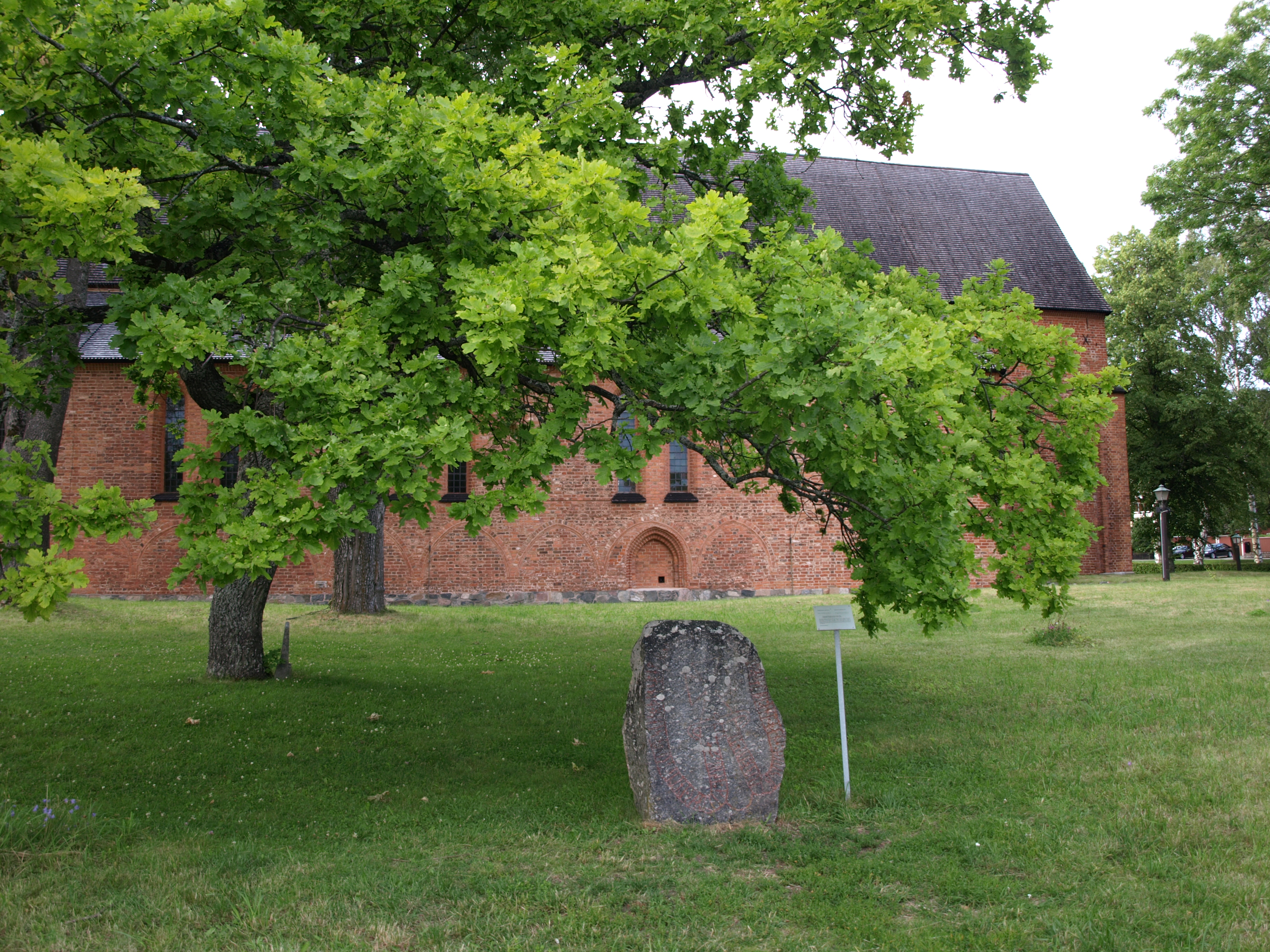
U 379 before the church.

The Kyrkogården Runestones are three Viking Age memorial runestones located at the cemetery of St. Mary's Church in Sigtuna, Stockholm County, Sweden, in the historic province of Uppland. One of the runic inscriptions documents the existence of a Viking Age mercantile guild in Sweden.

== U 379 ==
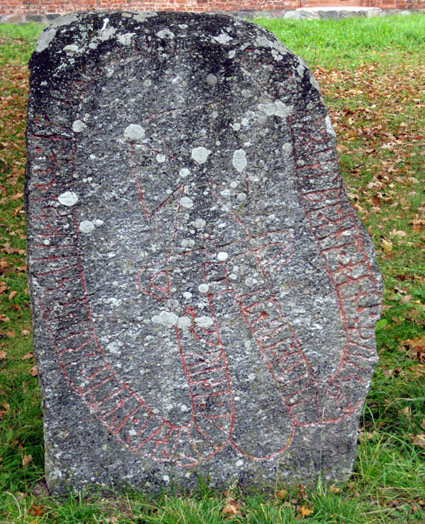
U 379 with its guild inscription

The inscription on the runestone listed as U 379 in the Rundata catalog consists of runic text in the younger futhark on a serpent that encircles a cross. The inscription on the granite stone is classified as being carved in runestone style KB, which is a designation used for designs that feature serpents bordered or framed by a runic text band.

The runic text indicates that the stone was a memorial raised by members of a mercantile guild in memory of one of their members named Þorkell. U 379 is one of four runestones that mention guilds in Viking Age Sweden, the others being U 391 in Prästgatan, Ög 64 in Bjälbo, and Ög MÖLM1960;230 in Törnevalla. These stones and others which discuss félags are evidence of the trading activities during this period of Scandinavian history, and U 379 evidence of Sigtuna being a center of trade. Both U 379 and U 391 refer to a Frisian guild. Although merchants from Frisia dominated trade in northwest Europe from about 725 to 830, it is not believed that these two runestones indicate that the guild consisted of ethnic Frisians since the runic text is in Old Norse and the names (except for possibly one on U 391) are Scandinavian. It has been suggested that the word frisa in the late Viking Age had come to denote any person who was a merchant, and that Frisian guild on these runestones simply meant a mercantile guild.

U 379 is signed by a runemaster named Þorbjôrn, who may either be the runemaster with the normalized name Torbjörn or Torbjörn skald. The name Torbjörn skald is on U 29 in Hillersjö and U 532 in Roslags-Bro, and there are several stones signed only with Þorbjôrn. Of these, it is believed that the same runemaster named Þorbjôrn that carved U 379 also signed U 391 in Prästgatan, which also mentions a guild, and U 467 in Tibble.

Of the names in the inscription, Þorkell is a diminutive form of Þorketil, which includes as a theophoric name element the Norse pagan god Thor and means a "Vessel of Thor" or "Kettle of Thor", possibly referring to a type of sacrificial cauldron. The Poetic Edda poem Hymiskviða includes a story of Thor fetching a large cauldron to brew ale. The name Þorbjôrn also refers to the Norse god and translates as "Thor Bear". Although the names may refer to Norse pagan gods, this does not indicate any belief as the inscription clearly indicates a Christian faith with its cross.

=== Inscription ===
==== Transliteration of the runes into Latin characters ====
+ frisa : kiltar * letu * reisa * s(t)ein : þensa : ef(t)iʀ * (þ)(u)(r)--- ----a * sin : kuþ : hialbi : ant * hans : þurbiurn : risti

==== Transcription into Old Norse ====
Frisa gildaʀ letu ræisa stæin þennsa æftiʀ Þor[kel, gild]a sinn. Guð hialpi and hans. Þorbiorn risti.

==== Translation in English ====
The Frisian guild-brothers had this stone raised in memory of Þorkell, their guild-brother. May God help his spirit. Þorbjôrn carved.

== U 380 ==
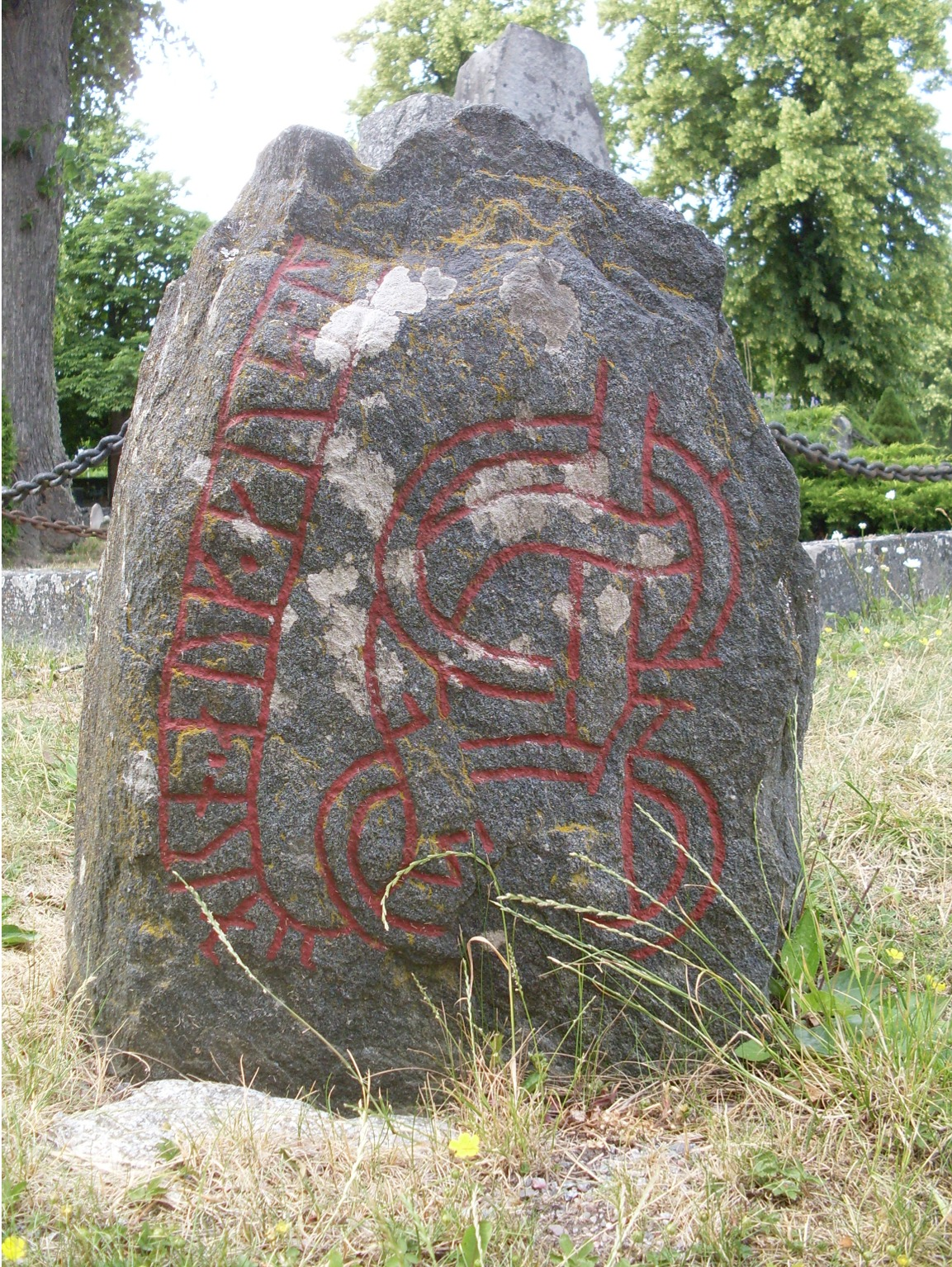
U 380

U 380 is the designation for a runestone with a very worn inscription, with two possible names read from the runes. The personal name Ásbjôrn from the inscription means "Devine Bear" and has a name element related to the Æsir, the principal gods of Norse mythology.

=== Inscription ===
==== Transliteration of the runes into Latin characters ====
...s--arn ' auk * kus * li... ...

==== Transcription into Old Norse ====
[A]s[bi]orn ok Kuss(?)/Guss(?) le[tu] ...

==== Translation in English ====
Ásbjôrn and Kúss(?)/Guss(?) had ...

== U 381 ==
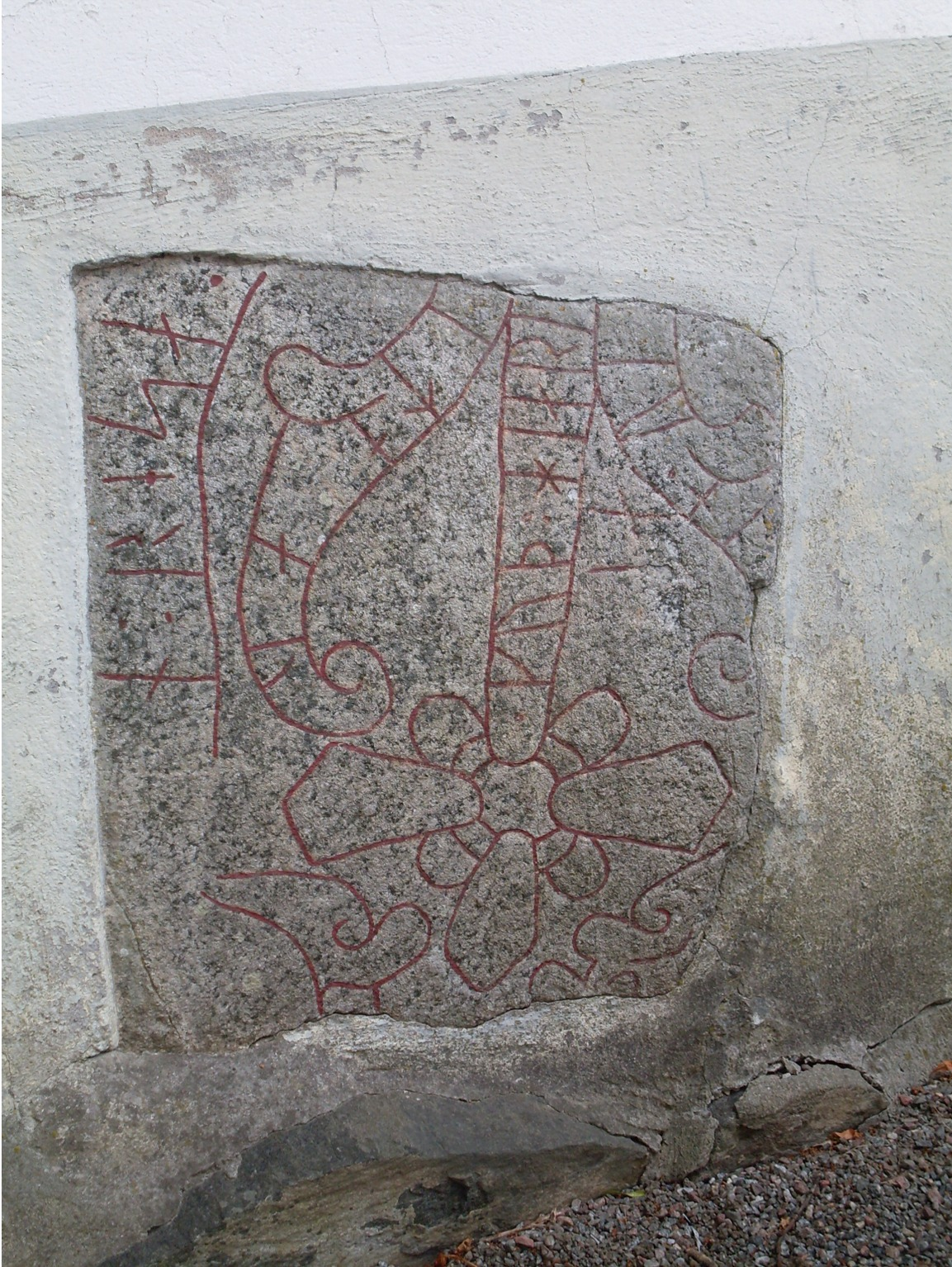
U 381 in the outer wall of the mausoleum.

U 381 is the designation for a runestone that is part of the outer wall of the Gerner family mausoleum near St. Mary's Church. Before the historical significance of runestones was understood, they were often re-used as materials in the construction of roads, bridges, and buildings like churches. The inscription on this stone is partial and only a few words that are part of a prayer can be clearly read.

=== Inscription ===
==== Transliteration of the runes into Latin characters ====
...-n * ui-... ... : ... ...n : resa : ... ...ita...a...u * kuþ : hiabi at * ...

==== Transcription into Old Norse ====
... ... ... ... ... ræisa ... ... Guð hialpi and ...

==== Translation in English ====
... ... ... ... ... raised ... ... May God help (his) spirit ...

== See also ==
- List of runestones
