= Thistle mistletoe formula =

Norse runic formula

The thistle mistletoe formula is a pagan Norse Runic formula, involving several rhyming words ending in -istill (typically at least þistill and mistill; thistle and mistletoe). The formula is attested in around 15 variants from the Viking Age.

== Attestations ==
=== Ledberg stone (Ög 181) ===
The Swedish Ledberg stone from Östergötland contains the formula. Following a standard memorial inscription, we read

ᚦᛘᚴ ᛬ ᛁᛁᛁ ᛬ ᛋᛋᛋ ᛬ ᛏᛏᛏ ᛬ ᛁᛁᛁ ᛬ ᛚᛚᛚ ᛬
þmk : iii : sss : ttt : iii : lll :

When resolved becomes, in normalized Old Icelandic spelling:

þistill, mistill, kistill
thistle, mistletoe, casket

=== Gørlev stone (DR 239) ===
Likewise, the Danish Gørlev stone contains the exact same formula, along with a younger futhark rune-row.

=== Saga of Bósi ===
The formula reaches its climax in a riddle in the legendary Icelandic Saga of Bósi and Herraud, where it reads (from manuscript AM. 586 4:0, transliterated into the Latin alphabet):

r.o.þ.k.m.u. iiiiii. ssssss. tttttt. iiiiii. llllll

Resolved and normalized, we get:

ristill, eistill, þistill, kistill, mistill, vistill
plowshare, testicle, thistle, box/casket, mistletoe, ?

The meaning of the final word, uistil (vistill), is unclear.
