= Lindö =

- Location within Östergötland Location within Sweden
- Coordinates: 58°37′N 16°15′E
- Country: Sweden
- Province: Östergötland
- County: Östergötland County
- Municipality: Norrköping Municipality

Area
  - Total: 3.20 km^{2} (1.24 sq mi)

Population (31 December 2010)
  - Total: 4,915
  - Density: 1,537/km^{2} (3,980/sq mi)
- Time zone: UTC+1 (CET)
  - Summer (DST): UTC+2 (CEST)

Lindö is a locality situated in Norrköping Municipality, Östergötland County, Sweden with 4,915 inhabitants in 2010. It is situated just a few kilometers from the centre of the city of Norrköping and is often considered part of it.

Lindö is considered one of the municipality's wealthier areas and has the second highest house price (after Kneippen).

== See also ==
Skarpåker Stone
