= Bind rune =

Ligature of two or more runes

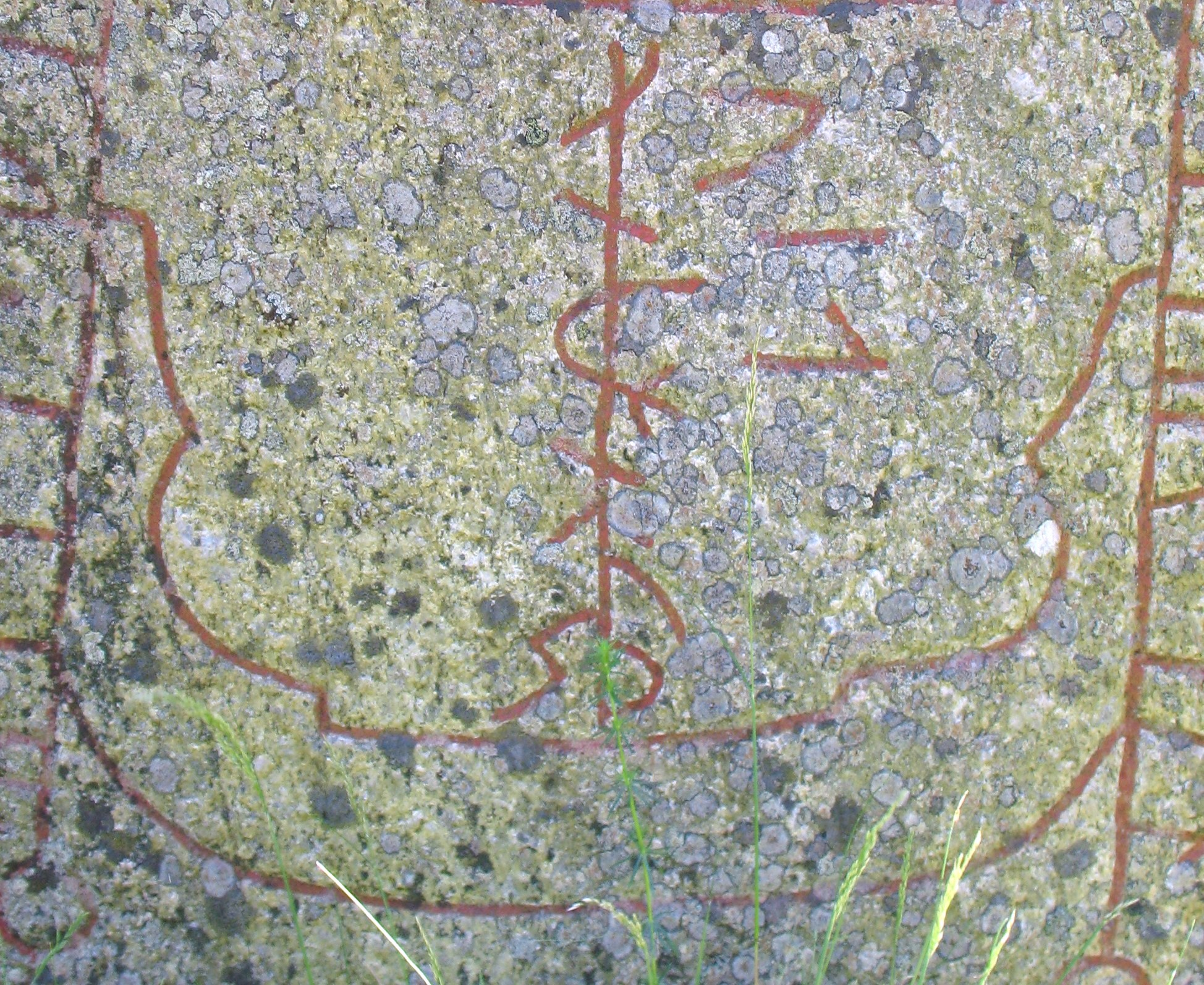
A boat whose mast is formed with the bind runes þ=r=u=t=a=ʀ= =þ=i=a=k=n, on the runestone Sö 158 at Ärsta, Södermanland, Sweden. The bind runes tell that the deceased was a strong thegn.

A bind rune, or bindrune (Icelandic: bandrún), is a Migration Period Germanic ligature of two or more runes. They are extremely rare in Viking Age inscriptions, but are common in earlier (Proto-Norse) and later (medieval) inscriptions.

On some runestones, bind runes may have been ornamental and used to highlight the name of the carver.

== Description ==
There are two types of bind runes. Normal bind runes are formed of two (or rarely three) adjacent runes which are joined together to form a single conjoined glyph, usually sharing a common vertical stroke (see Hadda example below). Another type of bind rune called a same-stave rune, which is common in Scandinavian runic inscriptions but does not occur at all in Anglo-Saxon runic inscriptions, is formed by several runic letters written sequentially along a long common stemline (see þ=r=u=t=a=ʀ= =þ=i=a=k=n example shown in image). In the latter cases the long bind rune stemline may be incorporated into an image on the rune stone, for example as a ship's mast on runestones Sö 158 at Ärsta and Sö 352 in Linga, Södermanland, Sweden, or as the waves under a ship on DR 220 in Sønder Kirkeby, Denmark.

== Examples ==
=== Elder futhark ===
Examples found in Elder Futhark inscriptions include:

- Stacked Tiwaz runes: Kylver Stone, Seeland-II-C
- Gebô runes combined with vowels: Kragehul I
- The syllable ing written as a ligature of Isaz and Ingwaz (the so-called "lantern rune").

=== Anglo-Saxon Futhorc ===
Bind runes are not common in Anglo-Saxon inscriptions, but double ligatures do sometimes occur, and triple ligatures may rarely occur. The following are examples of bind-runes that have been identified in Anglo-Saxon runic inscriptions:

- The word gebiddaþ is written with a ligatured double ᛞ (dd) on the Thornhill III rune-stone
- The name Hadda is written with a ligatured double ᛞ (dd) on the Derbyshire bone plate
- The word broþer is written with a ligatured ᛖ and ᚱ (er) on some Northumbrian stycas
- The Latin word meus is written as mæus with a ligatured ᛗ and ᚫ (mæ) on the Whitby comb
- The inscription [h]ring ic hatt[æ] ("ring I am called") is written with a ligatured ᚻ and ᚪ (ha) on the Wheatley Hill finger-ring
- The names of the evangelists, Mat(t)[h](eus) and Marcus are both written with a ligatured ᛗ and ᚪ (ma) on St Cuthbert's coffin
- The name Dering may be written with a triple ligatured ᛞ, ᛖ and ᚱ (der) on the Thornhill III rune-stone (this reading is not certain)
- The word sefa is written with a ligatured ᚠ and ᚪ (fa) on the right side of the Franks Casket
- Double ligatured runes ᛖᚱ (er), ᚻᚪ (ha) and ᛞᚫ (dæ) occur in the cryptic runic inscription on a silver knife mount at the British Museum
- The word gægogæ on the Undley bracteate is written with ligatured ᚷ and ᚫ (gæ) and ᚷ and ᚩ (go)
- A ligatured ᚾ and ᛏ (nt) occurs in the word glæstæpontol on a cryptic inscription on a silver ring from Bramham Moor in West Yorkshire
- A triple ligature ᛞ, ᛗ and ᚩ (dmo) occurs on a broken amulet found near Stratford-upon-Avon in 2006. This is the only known certain Anglo-Saxon triple bind rune. There is possibly a faint ᛖ, ᛞ (ed) bind rune on the reverse of the amulet.
- The name Ecgbeorht engraved on an armband from the Galloway Hoard is written eggbrect with ligatured ᛖ and ᚳ (ec), and the final ᛏ (t) added above the final letter
- The otherwise unattested Anglo-Saxon name Eadruf ᛖᚪᛞᚱᚢᚠ is inscribed on a gold Latin cross pendant, with ligatured ᛞ and ᚱ (dr) and probable ligatured ᛖ and ᚪ (ea)
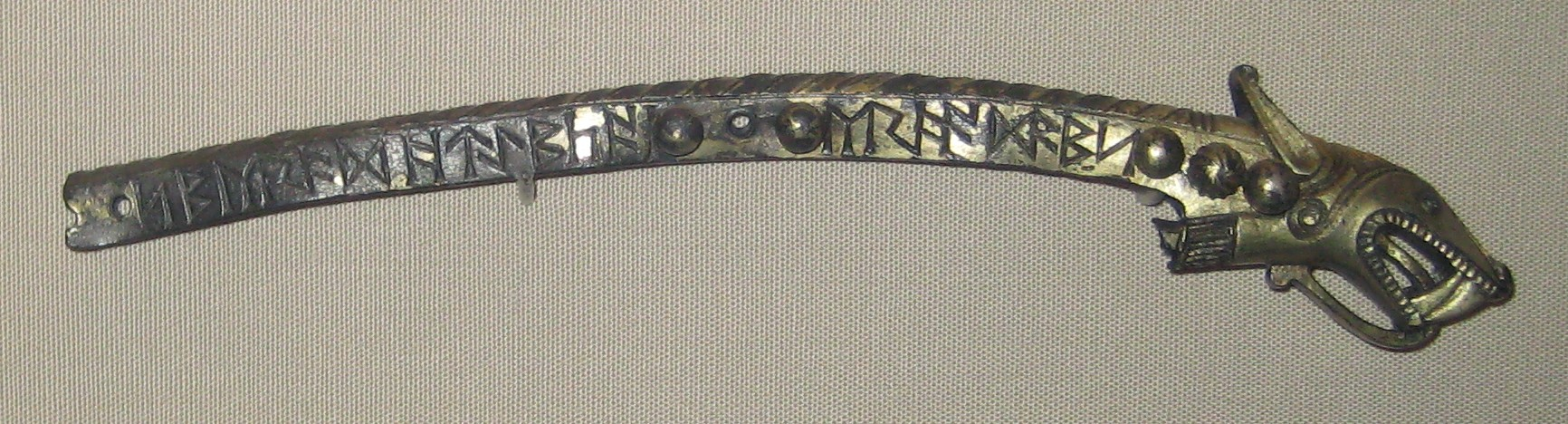
Cryptic runic inscription on a silver knife mount, with several bind runes
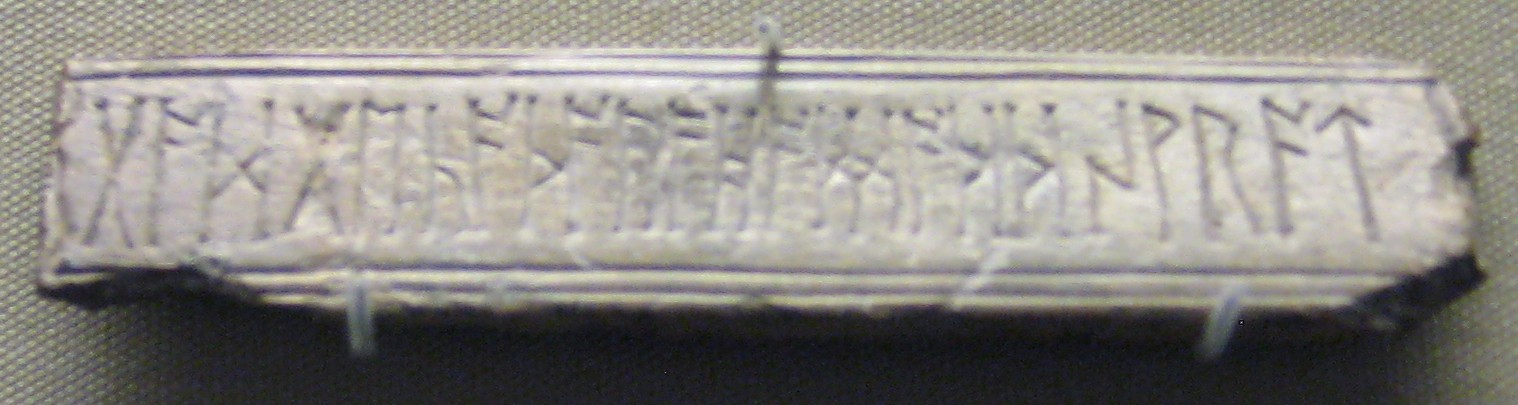
The "Derbyshire bone plate", showing the name Hadda with ligatured double ᛞ

== Modern use ==
- The Bluetooth logo merges the runes analogous to the modern Latin alphabet letters h and b; ᚼ (Hagall) and ᛒ (Berkanan) together, forming a bind rune. The two letters form the initials 'H B', alluding to the Danish king and viking raider Harald Bluetooth, for whom Bluetooth was named.
- The former logo of Thor Steinar featured a combination of a *tiwaz rune (ᛏ) and a *sowilo rune ᛋ. This logo caused controversy as the runes were so combined that a part of the logo became very similar to the insignia of the Schutzstaffel.

== Gallery ==
The a and the þ runes in ligature on the Rök runestone

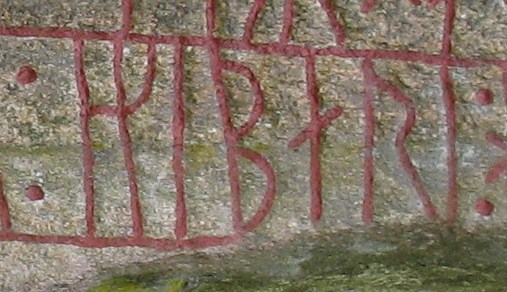
The s and k runes in ligature in the Old Norse word skipari ("sailor") on the Tuna Runestone in Småland

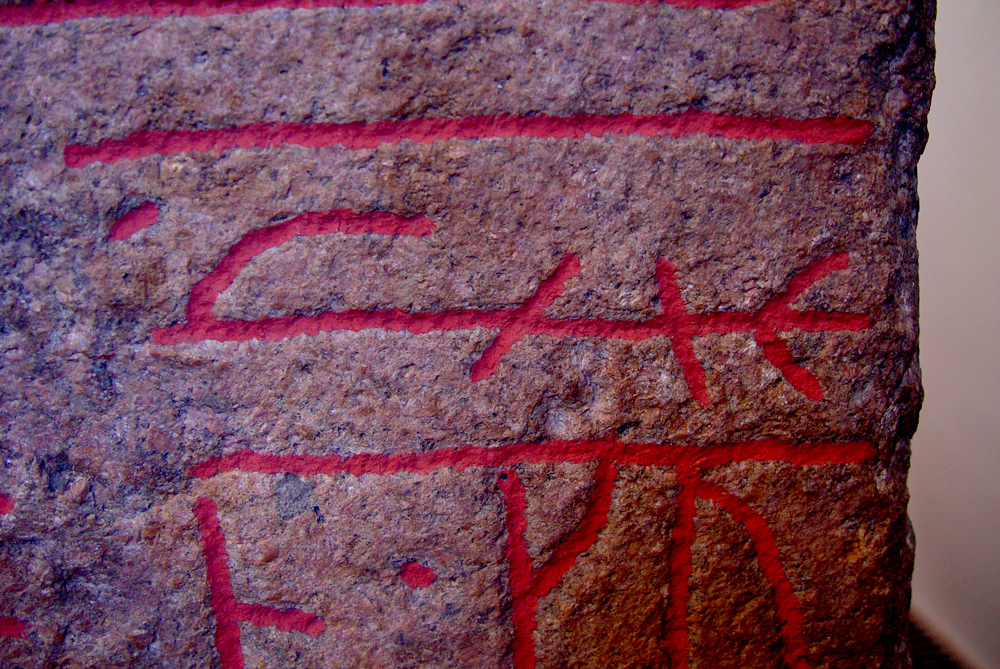
A bind rune for the word runaʀ on the Sønder Kirkeby Runestone in Denmark

Bluetooth logo (20th/21st-century bind rune of ᛡ (Hagall) and ᛒ (Bjarkan))

== See also ==
- Cipher runes
- Helm of Awe
- Pseudo-runes
- Runestone
