= Tullstorp Runestone =

Viking runestone in Skåne, Sweden

Coordinates: 55.4099°N 13.4666°E

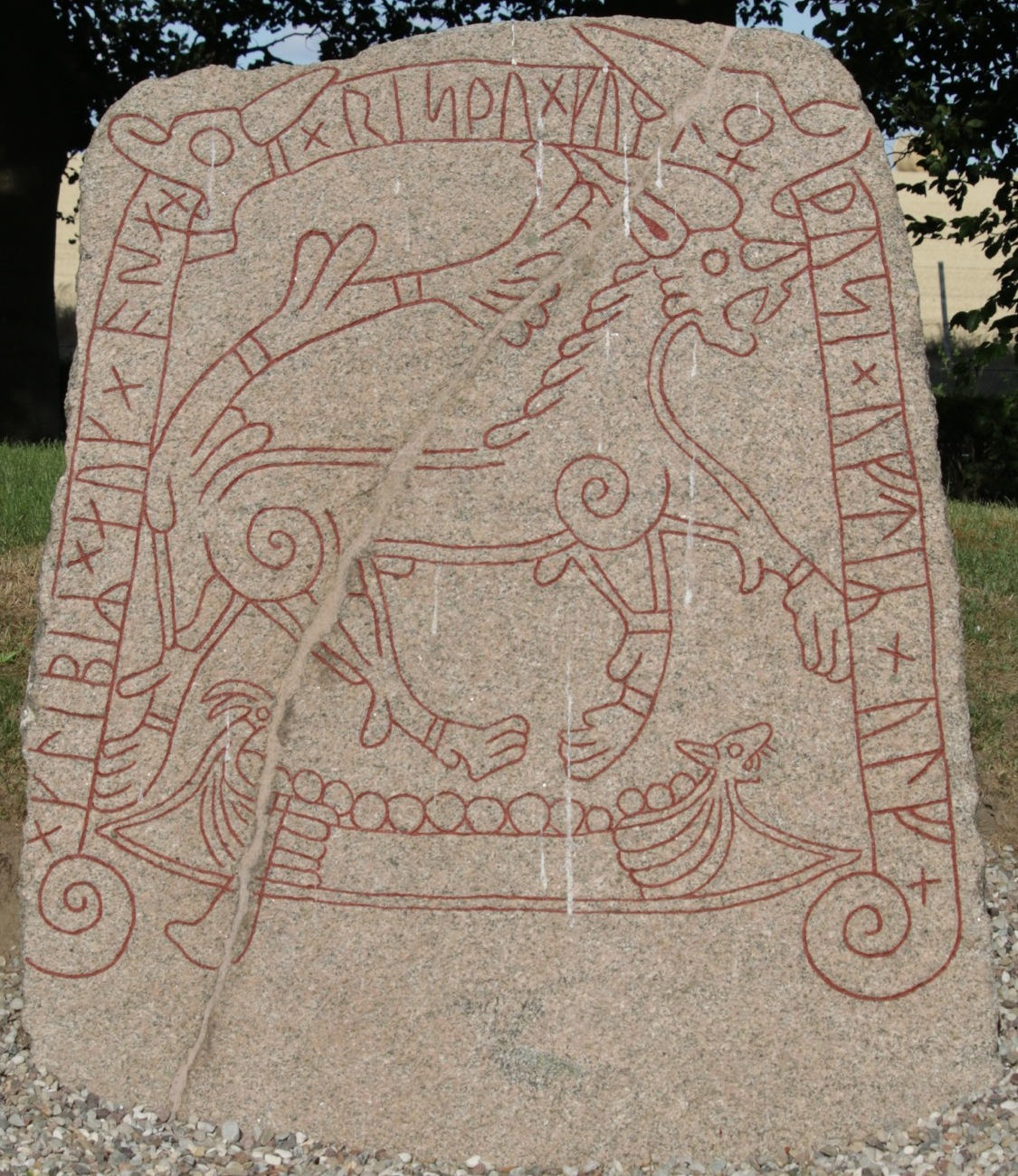
- Writing: Younger Futhark
- Created: c. 1000 AD
- Discovered: 1846 AD; Tullstorp, Skåne, Sweden
- Present location: Skåne, Sweden
- Culture: Norse
- Rundata ID: DR 271
- Runemaster: Unknown

The Tullstorp Runestone is a Viking Age memorial runestone, listed as DR 271 in the Rundata catalog, that is located in Tullstorp, which is about twenty kilometers east of Trelleborg, Skåne County, Sweden, and in the historic province of Scania.

== Description ==
The inscription on the Tullstorp Runestone consists of runic text on a serpent band that frames a central image consisting of a ship and a beast, which has been described as being a wolf. The stone is granite and 1.7 meters in height, and the inscription is classified as being carved in runestone style Pr1, which is also known as Ringerike style.

The original site of the Tullstorp Runestone is unknown. It was first noted in 1624 when it was installed in the wall of a church, and rediscovered when the old church in Tullstorp was torn down in 1846. Before the historical significance of runestones was understood, they were often used as materials in the construction of buildings, walls, and roads. The stone first ended up in the wall surrounding the church yard, later it was moved to the current position inside the church yard. It is dated from about 1000 AD.

The ship and the wolf in the central image probably reflects the Ragnarök myth, which would make the Great Wolf Fenrir and the ship Naglfar. The ship is shaped like an ancient galley with beakheads both fore and aft and is unlike any known Viking ship, suggesting from its archaic form that it is a symbolic ship associated with ritual. Other inscriptions with similar features which may depict ancient, symbolic ships include DR 77 in Hjermind, DR 119 in Spentrup, DR 258 in Bösarp, and DR 328 in Holmby. The wolf has a mane and pointed ears similar to the depiction of the wolf on inscription DR 284 of the Hunnestad Monument and the two wolves on DR 314, the Lund 1 Runestone.

The runic text indicates that the stone was raised as a memorial to a man named Ulfr. Besides the Ragnarök myth discussed above, it may be that the image of the wolf was inspired by this man's name, which in Old Norse means "Wolf." It has been pointed out that the Old Norse phrase in the runic text, reistu kuml ("raised this monument"), is somewhat rare, but does appear on seven other runestones, Sm 27 in Berga, Ög 94 in Harstads, DR 13 in Skivum, DR 383 in Vester Marie, Sö 173 in Tystberga, U 735 in Långarnö (where the wording is reversed), and U 1066 in Åkerby.

Locally the stone is known as the Tullstorpstenen.

== Inscription ==
The first normalization is Old West Norse, the second is Old East Norse.

× ᚴᛚᛁᛒᛁᛦ × ᛅᚢᚴ × ᚨᛋᛅ {× ¶ ×} ᚱᛁᛋᚦᚢ × ᚴᚢᛘᛚ {+ ¶} ᚦᚢᛋᛁ × ᚢᚠᛏᛁᛦ × ᚢᛚᚠ +
× klibiʀ × auk × osa {× ¶ ×} risþu × kuml {+ ¶} þusi × uftiʀ × ulf +
{} Kleppir/Glippir {} ok {} Ása {} reistu {} kuml {} þessi {} eptir {} Ulf. {}
{} Klæppiʀ/Glippiʀ {} ok {} Asa {} resþu {} kumbl {} þøsi {} æftiʀ {} Ulf. {}
{} Kleppir/Glippir {} and {} Ása {} raised {} signs/marks {} these {} after {} Ulfr. {}
“Kleppir/Glippir and Ása raised these monuments in memory of Ulfr.”

== Pictures ==
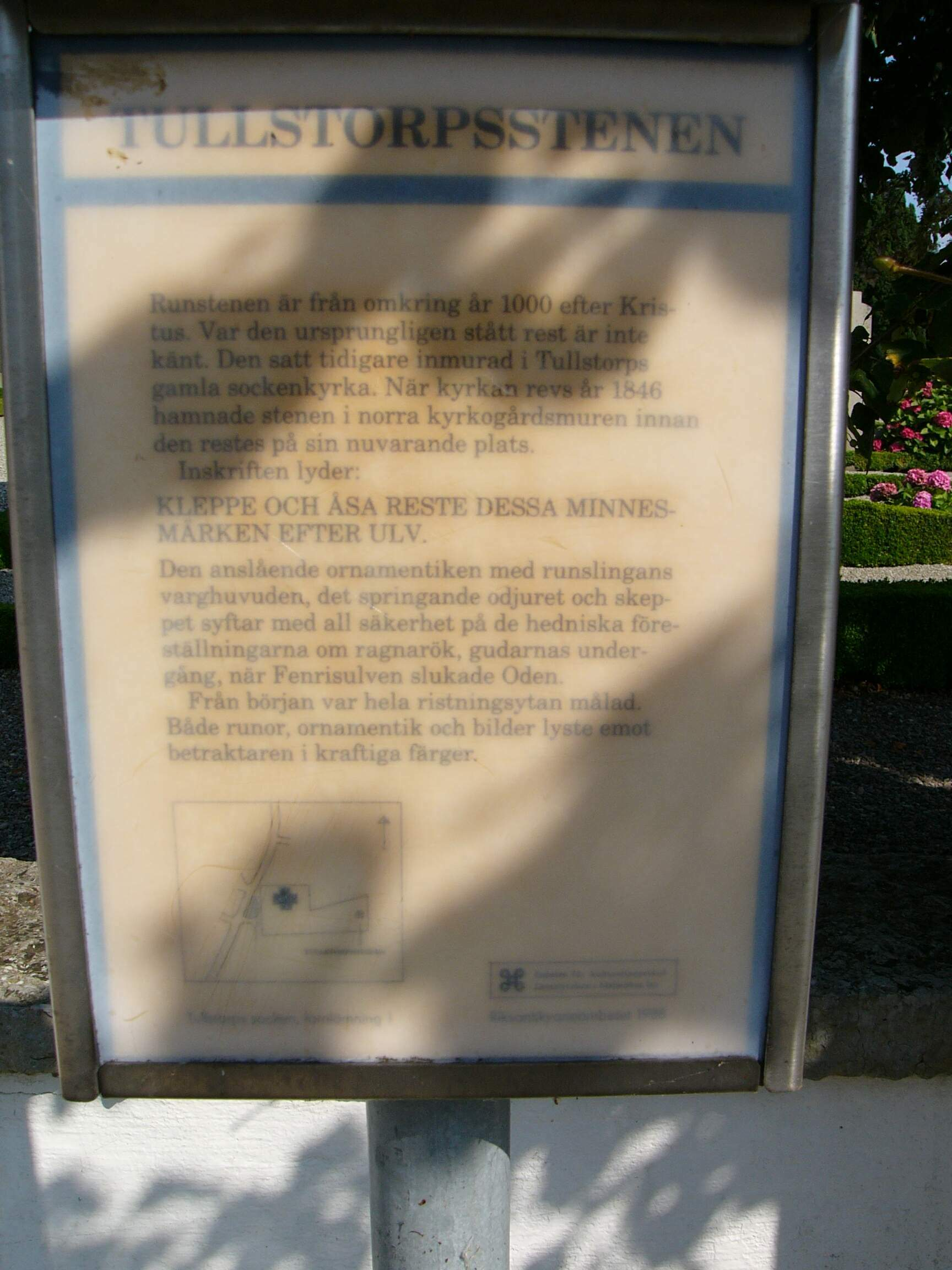
The sign at the stone - text in Swedish
