= Sønder Kirkeby Runestone =

Viking Age runestone found in Denmark

Coordinates: 55.6749°N 12.5756°E

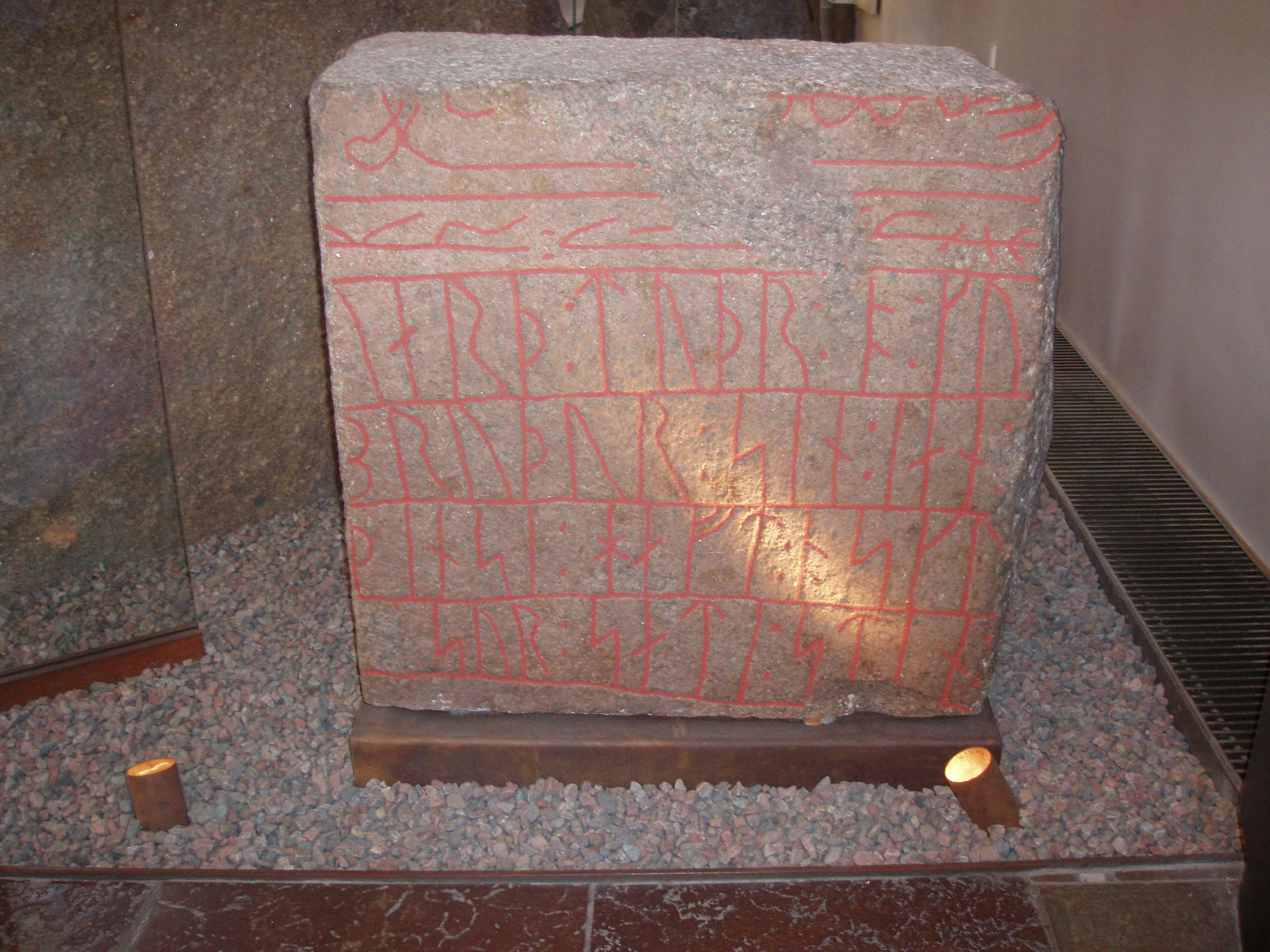
The Sønder Kirkeby Runestone is on display at the National Museum of Denmark.

The Sønder Kirkeby Runestone, listed as runic inscription DR 220 in the Rundata catalog, is a Viking Age memorial runestone that was discovered in Sønder Kirkeby, which is located about 5 kilometers east of Nykøbing Falster, Denmark.

== Description ==
The Sønder Kirkeby Runestone has been known to Danish antiquarians since 1802 when it was discovered in the northwest wall of the church in Sønder Kirkeby. Before the historical significance of runestones was understood, they were often reused as building materials in the construction of roads, bridges, and buildings. The stone was removed by the Danish Antiquarian Commission in 1811, and it is currently on display at the National Museum of Denmark in Copenhagen. The runestone, which is 0.79 meters in height, is known locally as the Sønder Kirkeby-stenen.

The inscription consists of four lines of runic text in the younger futhark that are below the image of a ship. Portions of the inscription and the ship image are damaged, which probably occurred when the stone was sized for use in the church wall. The Sønder Kirkeby Runestone is classified as being carved in runestone style RAK. This is considered to be the classification for the oldest style and is used for inscriptions where the ends of the runic text bands are straight and do not have any attached dragon or serpent heads. The inscription is dated as being carved after the Jelling stones.

The runic text states that the stone was raised by Sassur as a memorial for his brother Ásgautr, with the damaged text reconstructed as stating that the brother died in Gotland, Sweden. Other runestones which mention Gotland include Sö 174 in Aspö, the now-lost U 414 in Norrsunda, U 527 in Frötuna, U 614 in Torsätra, DR 259 in Fuglie, possibly Sö 47 in Vålsta, where the text has been damaged, and with U 375 in Vidbo referring to a location on Gotland.

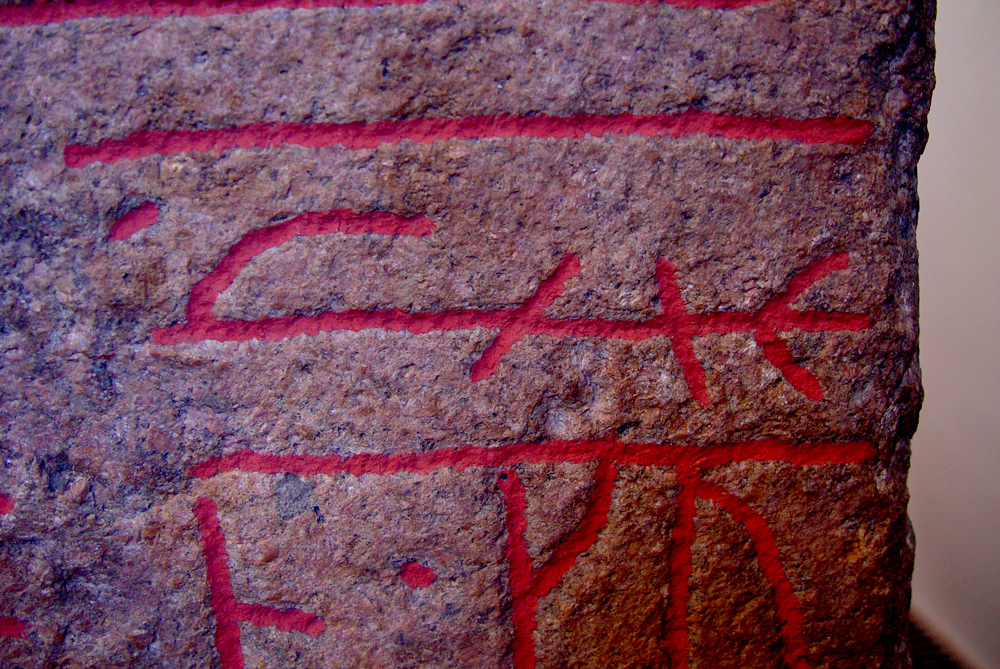
Detail showing the same-stave bind rune for the word runaʀ or "runes."

The inscription also has an invocation to the Norse pagan god Thor to "hallow these runes" that is hidden using three bind runes located in the waves below the image of the ship. A bind rune is a ligature that combines one or more runes into a single rune. In this case, one bind rune combines the runes þ=u=r for the name Thor, another the runes u=i=k=i for the word wigi or "hallow," and a third the runes (r)=u=n=a=ʀ for the word runaʀ or "runes." Because the runes are vertically separated along a common stave, runologists further classify these bind runes as being same-stave runes. Another example of an inscription using same-stave runes is the Swedish runestone Sö 158 at Ärsta.

The reason for hiding the invocation to Thor is unknown, but it is clearly intended to be hidden. There are two other runestones that have similar invocations to Thor located in Denmark, DR 110 from Virring and DR 209 from Glavendrup, and three other stones in Sweden, Ög 136 in Rök, Vg 150 from Velanda, and possibly Sö 140 at Korpbron. The wording of the invocation on the Sønder Kirkeby Runestone is most similar to that used on the Glavendrup stone. It has been noted that Thor is the only Norse god who is invoked on any Viking Age runestones.

== Inscription ==
(-)-sur : sati : stin {: ¶} þinsi : haft : osk(u)... ¶ bruþur : sin : ian : ... ¶ uarþ : tuþr : o : ku... ¶ þ=u=r : u=i=k=(i) : (r)=u=n=a=ʀ (:) ...
[Sa]sur {} satti {} sten {} þænsi {} æft {} Asgo[t] {} broþur {} sin, {} æn {} [hann] {} warþ {} døþr {} a {} Go[tlandi]. {} Þor {} wigi {} runaʀ {} [þæssaʀ].
Sassur placed this stone in memory of Ásgautr his brother, and [he] died on Gotland. May Þórr hallow [these] runes.
