= Ledberg stone =

Coordinates: 58°26′32″N 15°26′50″E

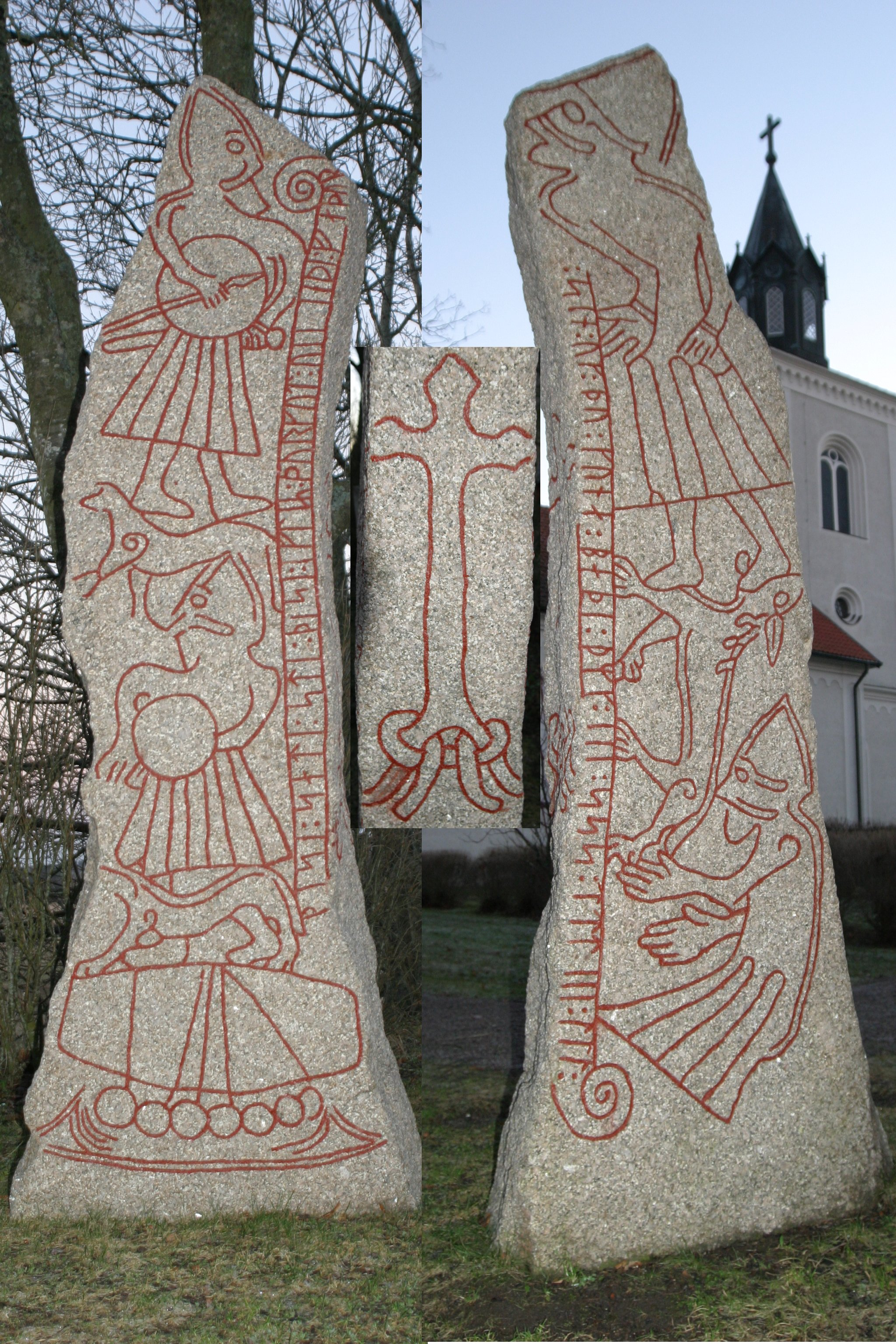
- Created: 11th Century
- Discovered: Ledberg, Östergötland, Sweden
- Rundata ID: Ög 181

Text – Native
- See article.

Translation
- See article.

The Ledberg stone, designated as Ög 181 under Rundata, is an image-stone and runestone located in Östergötland, Sweden.

== Description ==
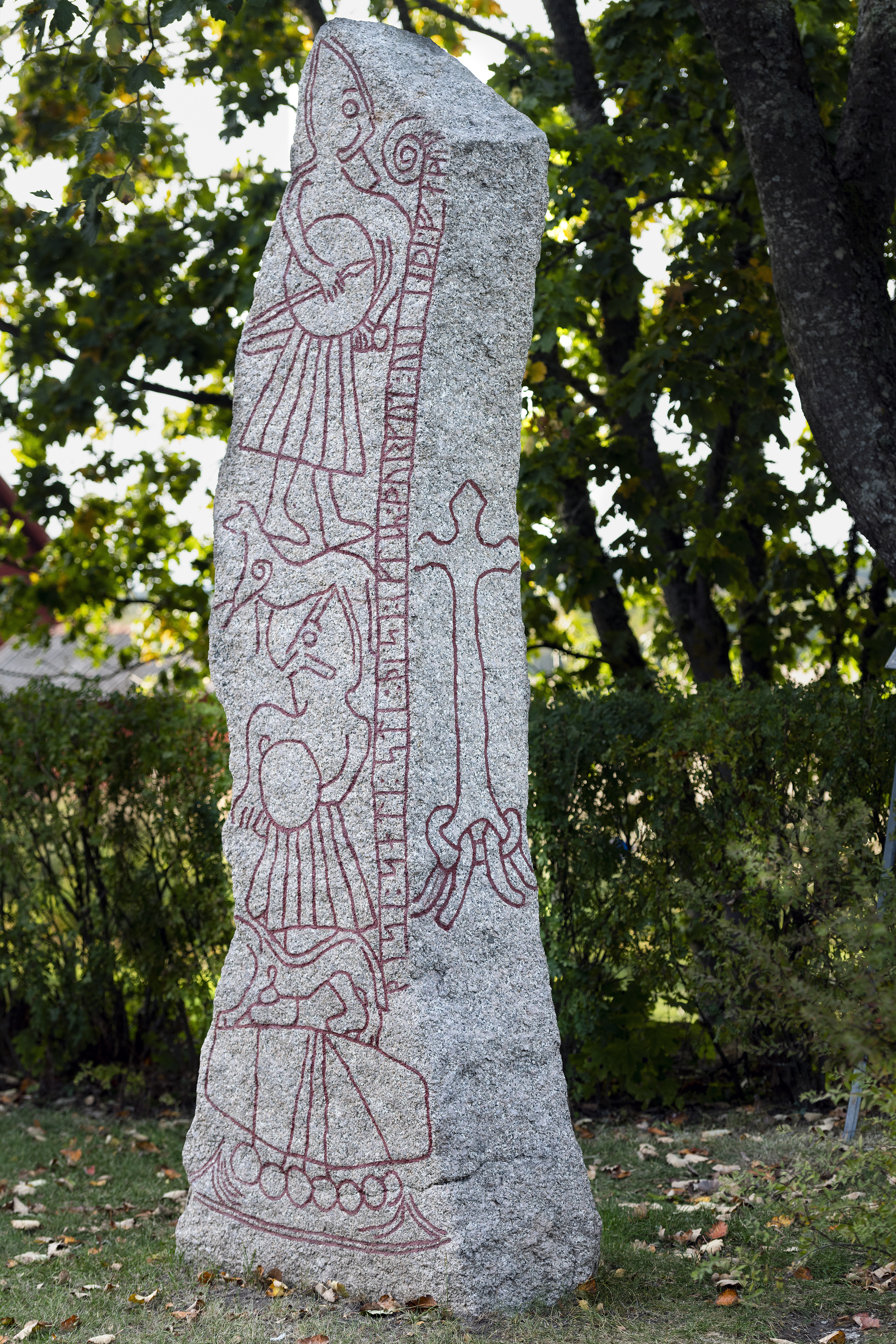
Photograph of the stone in 2020, A-side and cross.

The Ledberg stone is a partially surviving runestone, similar to Thorwald's Cross. It features a figure with his foot at the mouth of a four-legged beast, below which lies a legless, helmeted man, with his arms in a prostrate position. This is thought to be a depiction of Odin being devoured by the wolf Fenrir at Ragnarök, the final battle in Norse mythology, in which several gods meet their death. The battle and death of Odin are described in the poem Völuspá from the Poetic Edda.

Some scholars, however, believe that the images of the Ledberg stone depict the final story of either Þorgautr or Gunna, who are memorialized in the runic inscription. If the images are followed in the same order as the runes are written, they seem to create a chronological account. The first image is of a ship; this depicts a journey abroad. Next, there is a figure walking to the left, carrying what is most likely a shield, in preparation for departure. In the third image, the figure is carrying weapons and a shield to the right, probably marching to battle. At the top of the second side of the stone, the figure's foot is being bitten by a wolf and finally, we see the figure legless with arms sprawled, likely lying dead on the battlefield. Wolves were often used in Viking art and poetry to signify combat, so it is thought to be unlikely that the figure fell in battle due to wounds caused by a wolf.

The warrior figures have shields, one carries a spear, and all have moustaches and beards, except for the Odin figure. The helmets are conical and similar in shape to those shown on the Bayeux Tapestry.

== Inscription ==
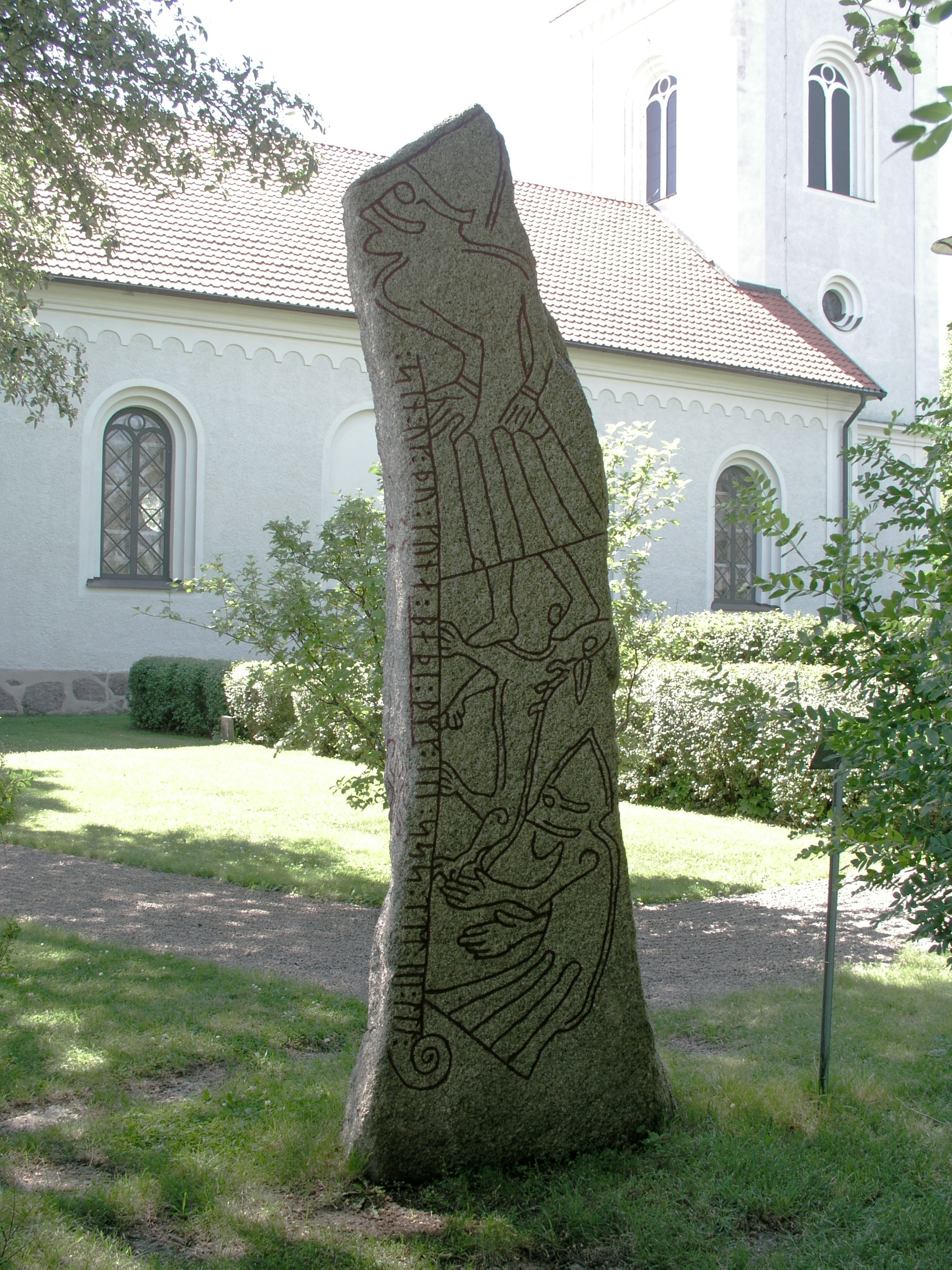
Photograph of the stone in 2006, B-side.

The runic inscription of the Ledberg stone is carved in the Younger futhark, and is dated to the 11th century. It reads:

ᛒᛁᛋᛁ ᛬ ᛋᛅᛏᛁ ᛬ ᛋᛏᛁ ᛬ ᚦᛁᛋᛁ ᛬ ᛁᚠᛏᛁᛦ ᛬ ᚦᚢᚱᚴᚢᛏ ᛬ ᚢ----ᚦᛁ ᛬ ᚠᛅᚦᚢᚱ
(b)isi · sati : sti[n] : þisi : iftiʀ : þurkut : u----þi : faþur
Bisi placed this stone in memory of Þorgautr … his father.

᛬ ᛋᛁᚾ ᛬ ᚢᚴ ᛬ ᚦᚢ ᛬ ᚴᚢᚾᛅ ᛬ ᛒᛅᚦᛁ ᛬
: sin : uk : þu : kuna : baþi :
And Gunna, both.

=== Charm ===
The final part of the B-side contains a rhyming charm or spell (galdr), which reads:

ᚦᛘᚴ ᛬ ᛁᛁᛁ ᛬ ᛋᛋᛋ ᛬ ᛏᛏᛏ ᛬ ᛁᛁᛁ ᛬ ᛚᛚᛚ ᛬
þmk : iii : sss : ttt : iii : lll :

which is to be read (in normalized Old Icelandic spelling):

þistill, mistill, kistill
thistle, mistletoe, casket

This type of charm (istill formula) is found on a few other inscriptions, among them the runic inscription on the Gørlev runestone, DR 239, from Sjælland, Denmark. It has been noted that Pliny the Elder recorded that the Celts gathered mistletoe as a cure for infertility, and that singing a charm over herbs increased their power, which may have led to the þistill mistill kistill combination.

Of the personal names in the inscription, Þorgautr contains as a name element the Norse god Thor.

== See also ==
- Runic magic
