= Scandinavian Runic-text Database =

Database of runic inscriptions

The Scandinavian Runic-text Database (Swedish: Samnordisk runtextdatabas) is a project involving the creation and maintenance of a database of transliterated runic inscriptions. The project's goal is to comprehensively catalog runestones in a machine-readable way for future research. The database is freely available via the Internet with a client program, called Rundata, for Microsoft Windows. For other operating systems, text files are provided or a web browser can be used to interact with the web applications Rundata-net or Runor.

== History ==
The origin of the Rundata project was a 1986 database of Swedish inscriptions at Uppsala University for use in the Scandinavian Languages Department. At an international runic seminar in 1990, it was proposed to expand the database to cover all Nordic runic inscriptions, but funding for the project was not available until a grant was received in 1992 from the Axel och Margaret Ax:son Johnsons foundation. The project officially started on January 1, 1993 at Uppsala University. After 1997, the project was no longer funded and work continued on a voluntary basis outside of normal work-hours. In the current edition, published on December 3, 2008, there are over 6500 inscriptions in the database.

Work is currently underway for the next edition of the database.

== Format of entries ==
Each entry includes the original text, in a transliterated form, its location, English and Swedish translations, information about the stone itself, et cetera. The stones are identified with a code which consists of up to three parts.

The first part describes the origin of the inscription. For Swedish inscriptions this contains a code for the province, and, for Extra-Nordic inscriptions, a code for the country (not ISO 3166).

Province code:

- Bl – Blekinge
- Bo – Bohuslän
- D – Dalarna
- G – Gotland
- Gs – Gästrikland
- Hal – Halland
- Hs – Hälsingland
- J – Jämtland
- Lp – Lappland
- M – Medelpad
- Nä – Närke
- Sk – Skåne
- Sm – Småland
- Sö – Södermanland
- U – Uppland
- Vg – Västergötland
- Vr – Värmland
- Vs – Västmanland
- Ög – Östergötland
- Öl – Öland

Country code:

- BR – British Islands
- DR – Denmark (includes Skåne, Halland, Blekinge, and Southern Schleswig). Stone numbers taken from Jacobsen & Moltke Danmarks Runeindskrifter (1941–1942)
- FR – Faroe Islands
- GR – Greenland
- IR – Ireland
- IS – Iceland
- N – Norway
- X – Other areas

The second part of the code consists of a serial number or a previous method of cataloging.

The third part of the code is a character which indicates the age (Proto-Norse, Viking Age, or Middle Ages) and whether the inscription is lost or retranslated.

- # – inscription lost, later replaced with †
- $ – newly retranslated
- M – inscription from the Middle Ages
- U – inscription in Proto-Norse, i.e. before c. 800.
- [inscription from the Viking Age, if M or U are not present]

As such, U 88 would mean that the stone is from Uppland and that it is the 88th to be catalogued. This system has its origin in the book Sveriges runinskrifter (English: "Runic Inscriptions of Sweden")

== Time periods used in Rundata ==
Most of the time, the Period/Datering information in Rundata just gives the date as V, meaning Viking Age, which is very broad. For some Danish inscriptions from Jacobsen & Moltke a more precise sub-period is given. The periods used are:

- Helnæs-Gørlev: c. 800 (or 750–c. 900)
- för-Jelling (pre-Jelling): c. 900
- Jelling (Jelling): 10th century and into the 11th century
- efter-Jelling (post-Jelling): c. 1000 – 1050
- kristen efter-Jelling (Christian, post-Jelling): 1st half of the 11th century

Many of the inscriptions in Rundata also include a field called Stilgruppering. This refers to date bands determined by the style of ornamentation on the stone as proposed by Gräslund:

The date bands are:

- RAK: c. 990–1010 AD
- FP: c. 1010–1050 AD
- Pr1: c. 1010–1040 AD
- Pr2: c. 1020–1050 AD
- Pr3: c. 1050 – a generation forward (en generation framåt)
- Pr4: c. 1060–1100 AD
- Pr5: c. 1100–1130 AD

== Version history ==
Software version	Database version	Database release date
Runor	2020	2020-12-03
Rundata-net	2016	2016-01-01
Rundata 3 & 3.1	2014	2014-09-02
Rundata 2.5	2008	2008-12-03
Rundata 2.0	2004	2004-09-18
Rundata 1.0	2001	2001-12-21
Rundata 1.0	2000	2000-05
Rundata 1.0	1998	1998-02
Rundata ?	1997-09	1997-09
Rundata ?	1997-01	1997-01
Rundata ?	1991	1991
Rundata 0	1987	1987

== Original reference works ==
The catalog numbers refer to a variety of reference works and scholarly publications. Some of the more notable of these include:

- Sveriges runinskrifter, various volumes.
- Jacobsen, Lis; Moltke, Erik (1941–42). Danmarks Runeindskrifter. Copenhagen: Ejnar Munksgaards Forlag.

Other bibliography information is available inside the Rundata client program by pressing F4.

== See also ==
- Runic alphabet
- Runestone
