= Gårdstånga 3 Runestone =

Runestone in Lund, Sweden

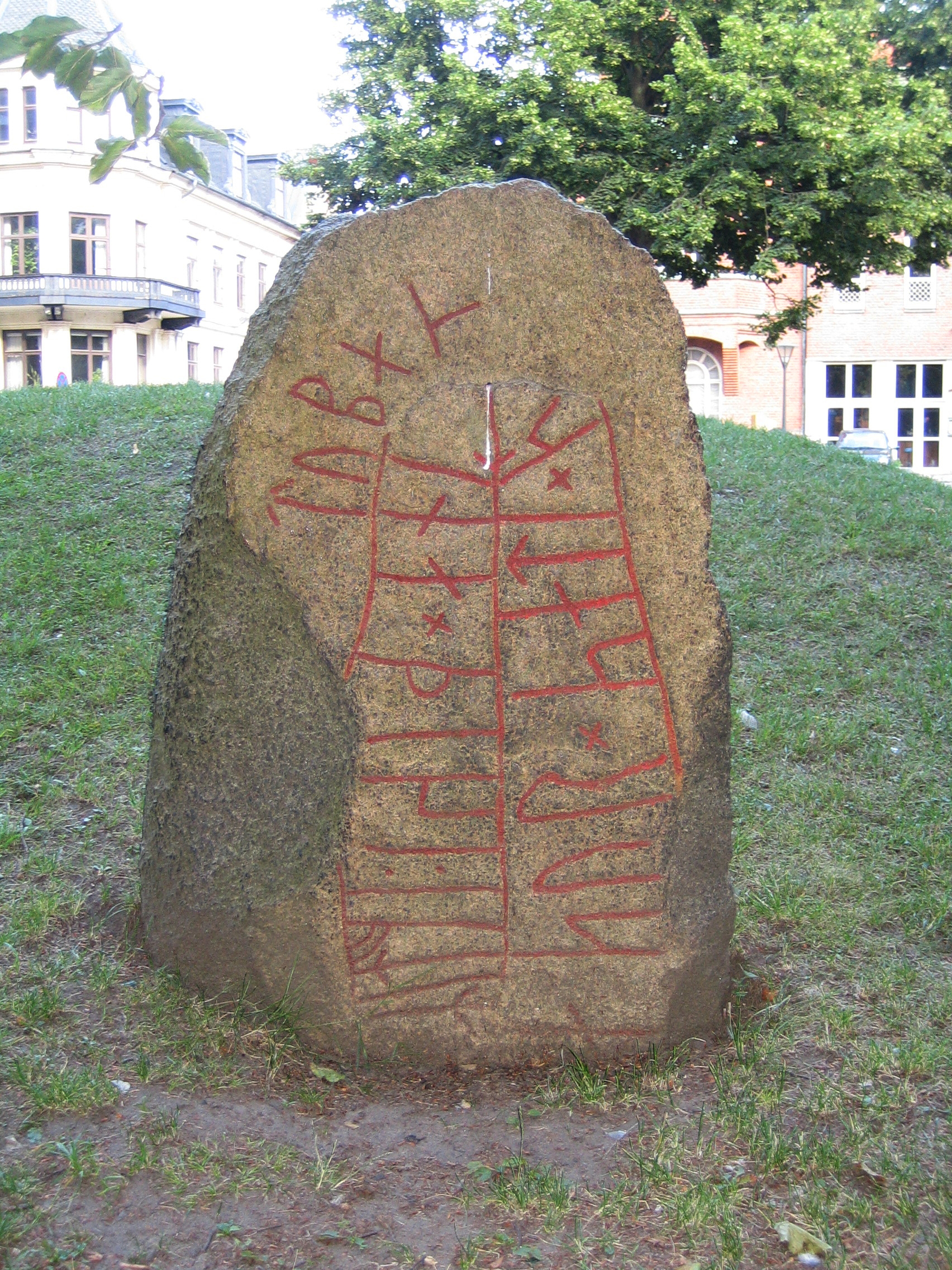
Gårdstånga 3 Runestone (DR 331)

The Gårdstånga 3 Runestone (DR 331) is a runestone located at Runstenshögen ("the runestone mound") in Lundagård, in Lund.

The stone was discovered in 1867 in the wall of Gårdstånga church. It was sent in 1868 to Lund together with runestone DR 330 discovered at the same time. The last sign in the inscription is not a rune, but it has been interpreted as Thor's Hammer, and in that case it was a pagan manifestation against the newly arrived Christian faith.

Other surviving runestones or inscriptions depicting Thor's hammer include runestones U 1161 in Altuna, Sö 86 in Åby, Sö 111 in Stenkvista, Vg 113 in Lärkegapet, Öl 1 in Karlevi, DR 26 in Laeborg, DR 48 in Hanning, and DR 120 in Spentrup.

== Inscription ==
Below follows a presentation of the runestones based on the Rundata project. The transcriptions into Old Norse are in the Swedish and Danish dialect to facilitate comparison with the inscriptions, while the English translation provided by Rundata gives the names in the de facto standard dialect (the Icelandic and Norwegian dialect):

Latin transliteration:

asur · sati × stina × þisi : iftiR ¶ tuba: ?

Old Norse transcription:

Assur satti stena þæssi æftiR Tobba (?).

English translation:

"Ôzurr placed these stones in memory of Tobbi"

== Sources ==
- Enoksen, Lars-Magnar, Skånska runstenar (Lund 1999) s.90 f.
- Rundata project
