= Fotr =

Fotr may refer to:

- Fot (Old Norse: Fotr), runemaster who flourished in mid-11th century Sweden
- Fótr, the thegn memorialized by the Norra Härene Runestone
