= Danish Runic Inscription 48 =

Coordinates: 56°01′09″N 8°30′45″E

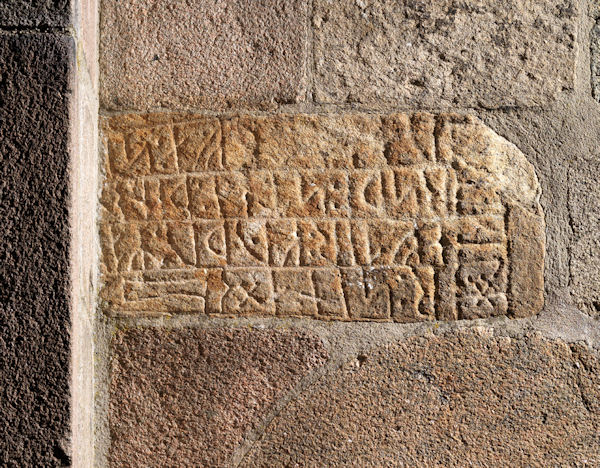
DR 48

Danish Runic Inscription 48 or DR 48 is the Rundata catalog number for a Viking Age memorial runestone from Hanning, which is about 8 km (5 miles) north of Skjern, Denmark. The runic inscription features a depiction of a hammer, which some have interpreted as a representation of the Norse pagan god Thor, although this interpretation is controversial.

== Description ==
The inscription on DR 48 consists of four lines of horizontal and one line of vertical runic text on a 1.1 m × 0.5 m (3 ft 7 in × 1 ft 8 in) granite block. The stone dates from the 12th century and was reused after being shaped in the construction of the south chancel wall of a church in Hanning. Before the historic nature of runestones was understood, they were often re-used as material for the construction of roads, bridges, and buildings. Although clearly visible in the wall for several centuries, the existence of the runestone was first reported in 1843. Because the stone was shaped for use in the wall, a portion of the text has been lost. The inscription also depicts a hammer within the runic text after the Old Norse word sina, which has been interpreted as being Thor's hammer Mjöllnir. Thor's hammer was used on several memorial runestones in Sweden and Denmark, perhaps as a parallel to or a pagan reaction to the use of the cross by Christians. Other surviving runestones or inscriptions depicting Thor's hammer include runestones U 1161 in Altuna, Sö 86 in Åby, Sö 111 in Stenkvista, Vg 113 in Bjärby, Öl 1 in Karlevi, DR 26 in Laeborg, DR 120 in Spentrup, and DR 331 in Gårdstånga. Because of the dating of the inscription to the 12th century based upon linguistic analysis, which is some 200 years after the Christianization of Denmark, some have questioned whether the hammer is actually a statement of heathenism. It has been suggested that the hammer is not a depiction of Mjöllnir but is instead a symbol identifying a blacksmith or other occupation. However, there are no parallels of such symbolic depictions on other medieval runestones, and the hammer is very similar to that on DR 26 in Laeborg, which is considered to be a depiction of Mjöllnir.

The inscription indicates the stone was raised as a memorial by a man possibly named Vagn who was the son of Tófi in memory of his mother Gyða. The vertical line of text likely names the runemaster who hewed or cut the runes.

== Inscription ==
ua-- : tofa : su(n) ¶ rsþi : sten : þene × ¶ eftir : Gyþu : moþ-¶r : sina ×÷: ¶ (×) (e)--kil : h...
<ua-->, {} Tofa {} sun {} resþi {} sten {} þænne {} {} æftir {} Gyþu, {} moþ[u]r {} sina. {} {} {} ...kell {} h[io].
<ua-->, Tófi's son, raised this stone in memory of Gyða, his mother. ...-kell (cut).
