= Altuna Runestone =

Memorial runestone

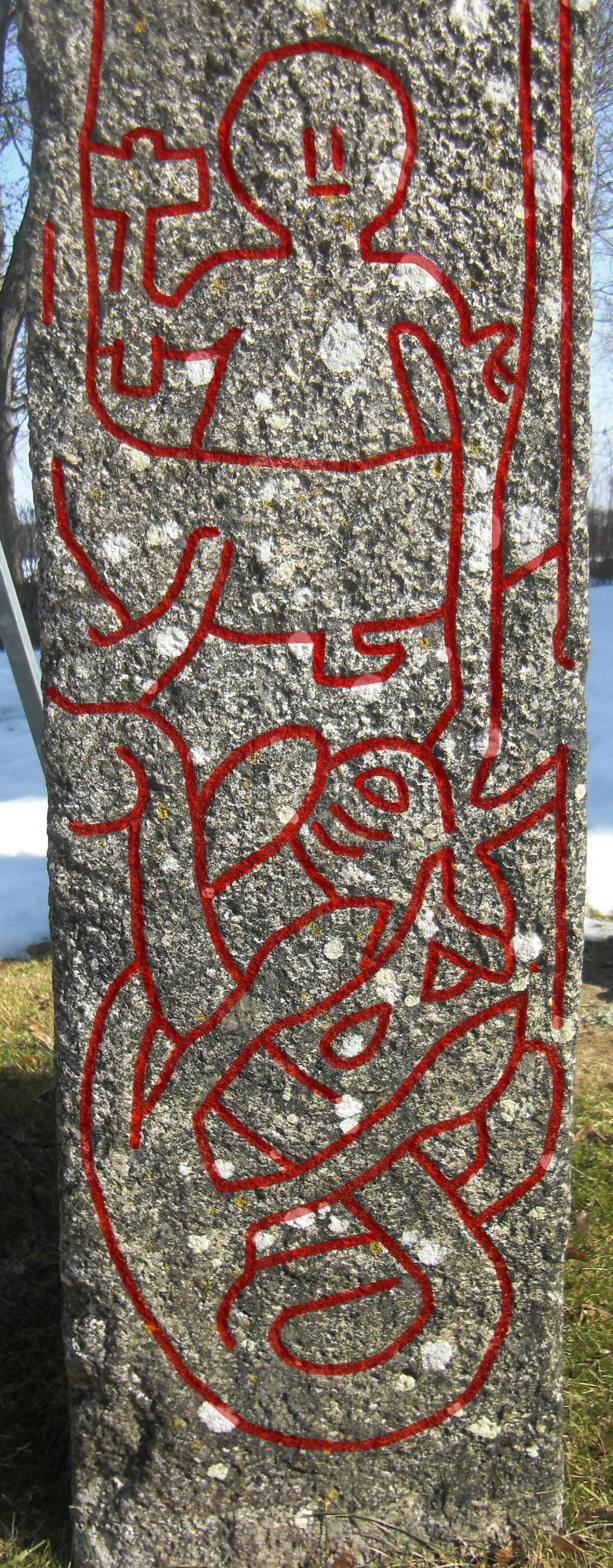
- Height: 1.95 meters
- Writing: Younger Futhark
- Created: 11th century
- Discovered: 1918; Altuna, Uppland, Sweden
- Present location: Altuna, Uppland, Sweden
- Culture: Viking
- Rundata ID: U 1161
- Runemaster: Several

Text – Native
- Old Norse : See article.

Translation
- See article

The Altuna Runestone (Altunastenen), listed as U 1161 in the Rundata catalog, is a Viking Age memorial runestone with images from Norse mythology that is located in Altuna, Uppland, Sweden.

== Description ==
The Altuna Runestone is a granite stone 1.95 metres (6 ft 5 in) in height that was discovered in 1918 by a local historian in the wall of a chapel located near its current location. Before the historical significance of runestones was recognized, they were often used as materials in the construction of roads, bridges, walls, and buildings. It is one of few surviving runestones with exclusively pagan illustrations from Norse mythology. Most surviving runestones were raised during the 11th century after the Christianization of Sweden, and they were raised by people who wanted to show that they too adhered to the new faith, at least outwardly so, because at least half of the runestones have inscriptions related to Christianity.

One side of the Altuna Runestone, however, illustrates a legend recorded in the Hymiskviða of the Poetic Edda, in which the Norse god Thor fishes for Jörmungandr, the Midgard serpent. Thor goes fishing with the jötunn Hymir using an ox head for bait, and catches Jörmungandr, who then either breaks loose or, as told in the Gylfaginning of the Prose Edda, the line is cut loose by Hymir. The Prose Edda provides the additional detail that while Thor was pulling on the line with Jörmungandr on the hook, his feet went through the bottom of the boat. The image on the Altuna Runestone does not show Hymir, which may be due to the narrow shape of the stone, but it shows Thor, his line and tackle and the serpent, and notably, Thor's foot which has been pushed through the hull of the boat. This encounter between Thor and Jörmungandr seems to have been one of the most popular motifs in Norse art. Three other picture stones that have been linked with the myth are the Ardre VIII image stone, the Hørdum stone, and the Gosforth Cross. A stone slab that may be a portion of a second cross at Gosforth also shows a fishing scene using an ox head.

The runic inscription suggests that those to whom the stone is dedicated, the father Holmfastr and his son Arnfastr, were burned, possibly in a case of arson known as quickfire, a method commonly used in Scandinavian feuds. Arnfastr and his brother Véfastr share the common name element fastr with their father, Holmfastr. A common practice at that time in Scandinavia was the repeating of one of the name elements from a parent's name in the names of the children to show the family connection.

The inscription is classified as being carved in runestone style Pr3, which is also known as Urnes style. This runestone style is characterized by slim and stylized animals that are interwoven into tight patterns. The animal heads are typically seen in profile with slender almond-shaped eyes and upwardly curled appendages on the noses and the necks. The inscription is signed by the runemasters with the normalized names Frösten and Balle and perhaps by Livsten. Balle was active in south-western Uppland and northern Södermanland during the second half of the eleventh century.

Other runestones depicting Thor's hammer include runestones Sö 86 in Åby, Sö 111 in Stenkvista, Vg 113 in Lärkegapet, Öl 1 in Karlevi, DR 26 in Laeborg, DR 48 in Hanning, DR 120 in Spentrup, and DR 331 in Gårdstånga.

== Inscription ==
First line is transliteration; second is transcription in Old Norse.

uifasþtr fulkahþr kuþar litu resa sþten ʀþti sen faþur ulfasþ arfast
Vifastr, Folkaðr, Guðvarr(?) letu ræisa stæin æftiʀ sinn faður Holmfast, Arnfast.
Véfastr, Folkaðr, Guðvarr(?) had the stone raised in memory of their father Holmfastr, (and in memory of) Arnfastr.

beþi feþrkag burnu e(n) ... bali fresþen liþ lifsþen... ...
Baðiʀ fæðrgaʀ brunnu, en [þæiʀ] Balli, Frøystæinn, lið Lifstæin[s ristu].
(version 1): Both father and son were burned, and Balli (and) Freysteinn, of Lífsteinn's retinue, carved.
(version 2): Both father and son were burned, and Balli (and) Freysteinn (and) Lífsteinn (carved?).

== Gallery ==
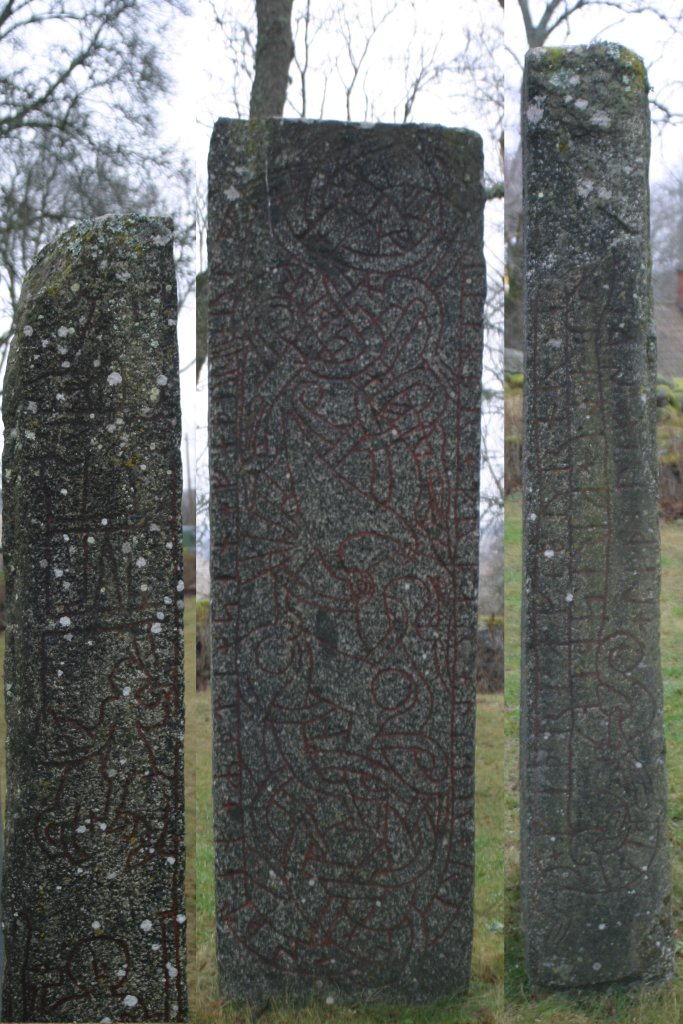
The three other sides of the stone.

Detail showing Thor's foot going through the boat as he struggles to pull up Jörmungandr.

== See also ==
- List of runestones
