= Risbyle Runestones =

Two runestones found in Uppland, Sweden

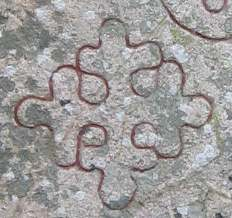
The Eastern cross on U 161, today the coat-of-arms of Täby Municipality

The Risbyle Runestones are two runestones found near the western shore of Lake Vallentunasjön in Uppland, Sweden, dating from the Viking Age.

== Description ==
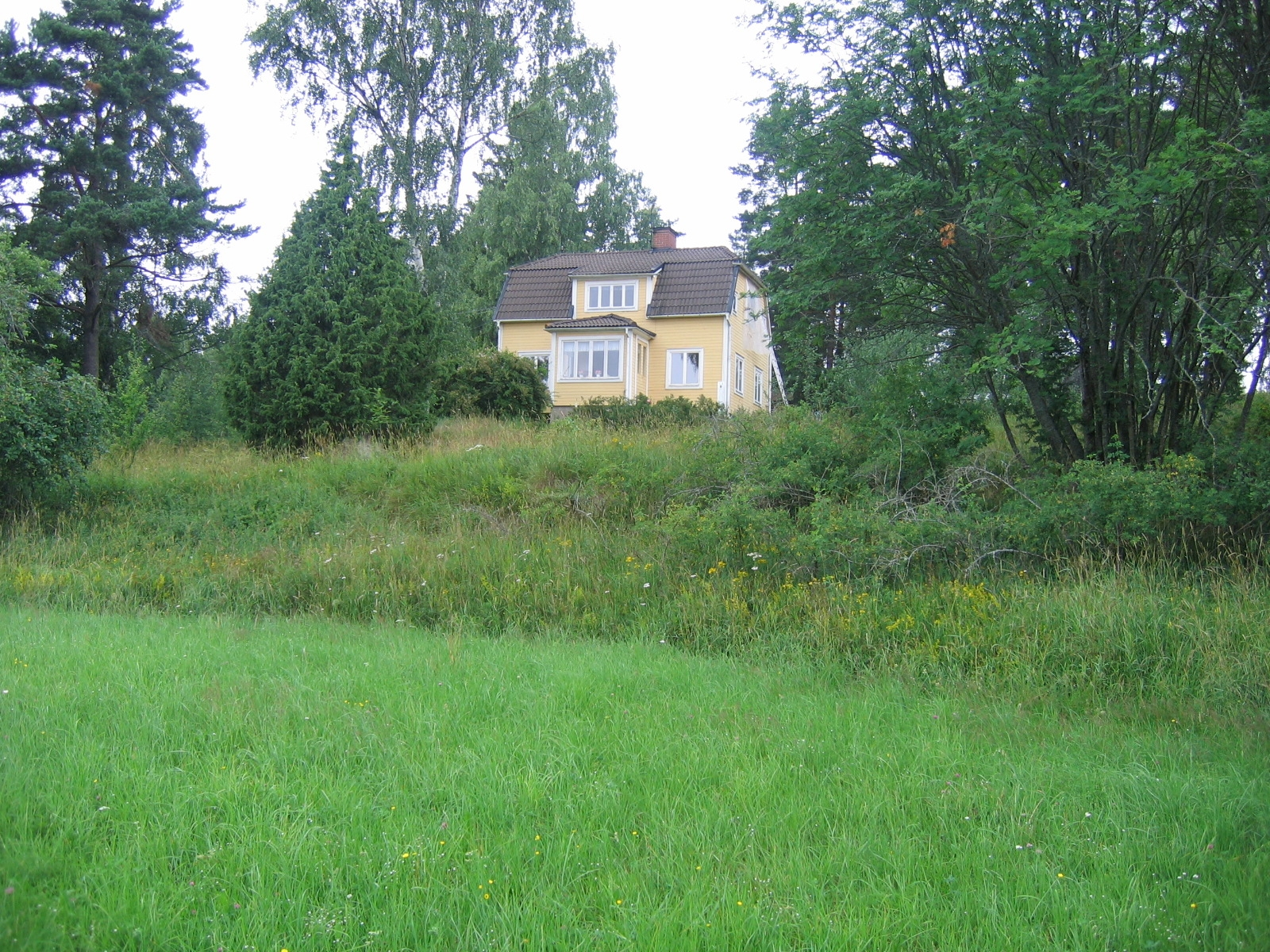
Risbyle overlooking the runestones

The Risbyle Runestones, listed in the Rundata catalog as U 160 and U 161, were engraved in Old Norse with the Younger Futhark in the early 11th century by the Viking Ulf of Borresta (Báristaðir) who had partaken three times in the danegeld in England and raised the runestone U 336 in the same region. They were raised in memory of Ulf of Borresta's kinsman-by-marriage Ulf in Skolhamarr (Skålhammar).

One of the runestones, U 161, has the Eastern cross which shows the influence of Byzantine culture on Sweden at this time through the Varangians who returned after having served the Emperor in Constantinople (see also the Greece Runestones and the Italy Runestones). The cross is today the coat-of-arms of Täby Municipality. Both runestones are in the style Pr1, and they have a pronounced Ringerike character.

The Skålhamra clan who asked Ulf of Borresta to make the runestones also had another couple of runestones made at Arkils tingstad across the lake, in addition to the runestone U 100 at a path in the forest.

== U 160 ==
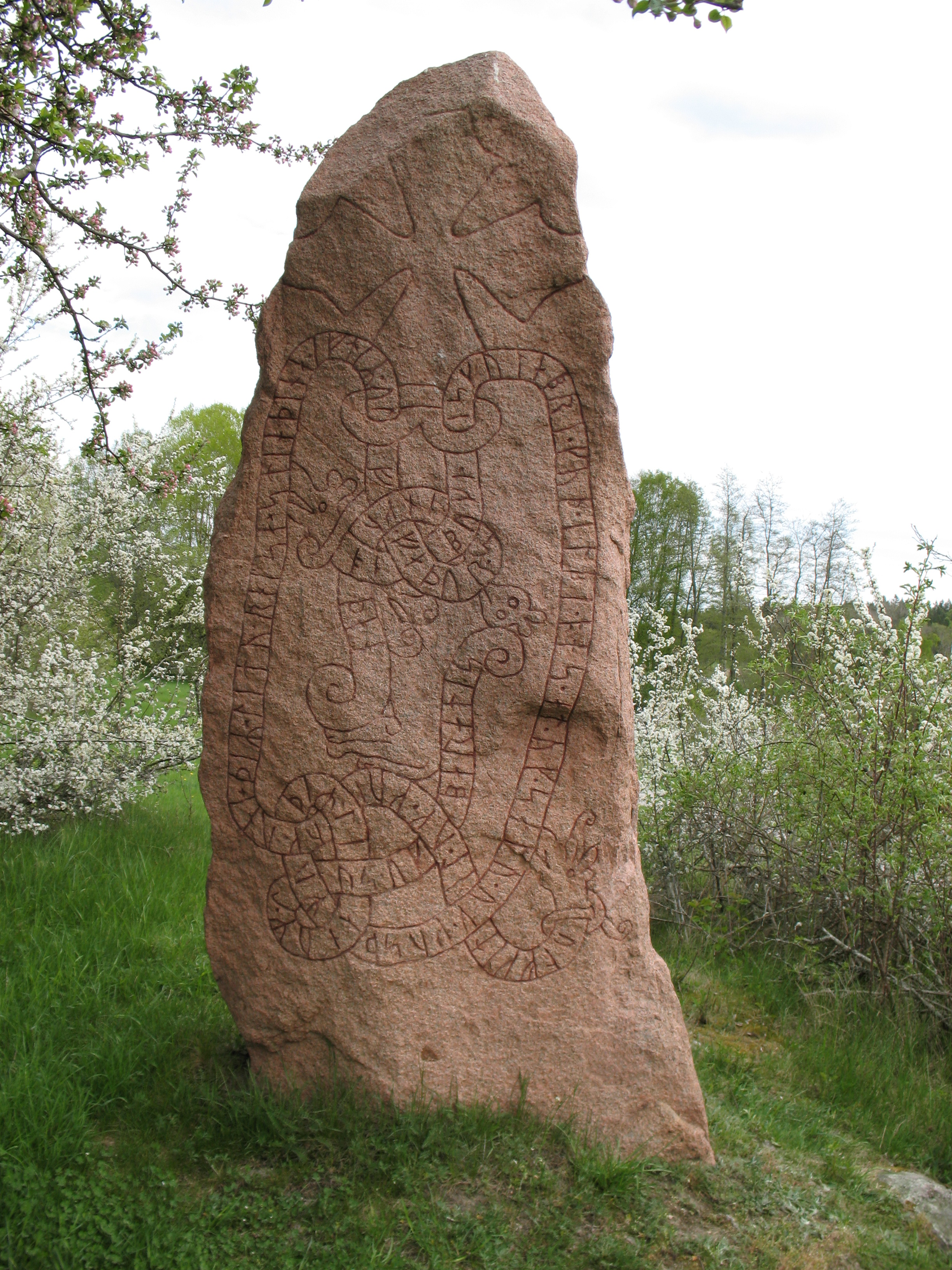
U 160

This runestone was raised after Ulfr of Skolhamarr by his children Ulfke(ti)ll, Gýi and Un(n)i. The runemaster is considered to be Ulfr of Báristaðir himself. The Norse word salu for soul in the prayer was imported from English and is first recorded during the tenth century.

The first normalization is Old West Norse, the second is Runic Swedish.

ulfkitil · uk · kui uk + uni + þiʀ × litu · rhisa × stin þina · iftiʀ · ulf · faþur · sin · kuþan on · buki · i skul(o)bri · kuþ · ilbi · ons · at · uk · salu · uk · kusþ muþiʀ · li anum lus · uk baratis
Ulfketill {} ok {} Gýi ok {} Uni/Unni {} þeir {} létu {} reisa {} stein þenna {} eptir {} Ulf, {} fǫður {} sinn {} góðan. Hann {} bjó {} í Skolhamri. {} Guð {} hjalpi {} hans {} ǫnd {} ok {} sálu {} ok {} Guðs móðir, {} lé honum ljós {} ok paradís.
Ulfkætill {} ok {} Gyi ok {} Uni/Unni {} þæiʀ {} letu {} ræisa {} stæin þenna {} æftiʀ {} Ulf, {} faður {} sinn {} goðan. Hann {} byggi {} i Skulhambri. {} Guð {} hialpi {} hans {} and {} ok {} salu {} ok {} Guðs moðiʀ, {} le hanum lius {} ok paradis.
Ulfketill and Gýi and Uni/Unni, they had this stone raised in memory of Ulfr, their good father. He lived in Skolhamarr. May God and God's mother help his spirit and soul; grant him light and paradise.

== U 161 ==
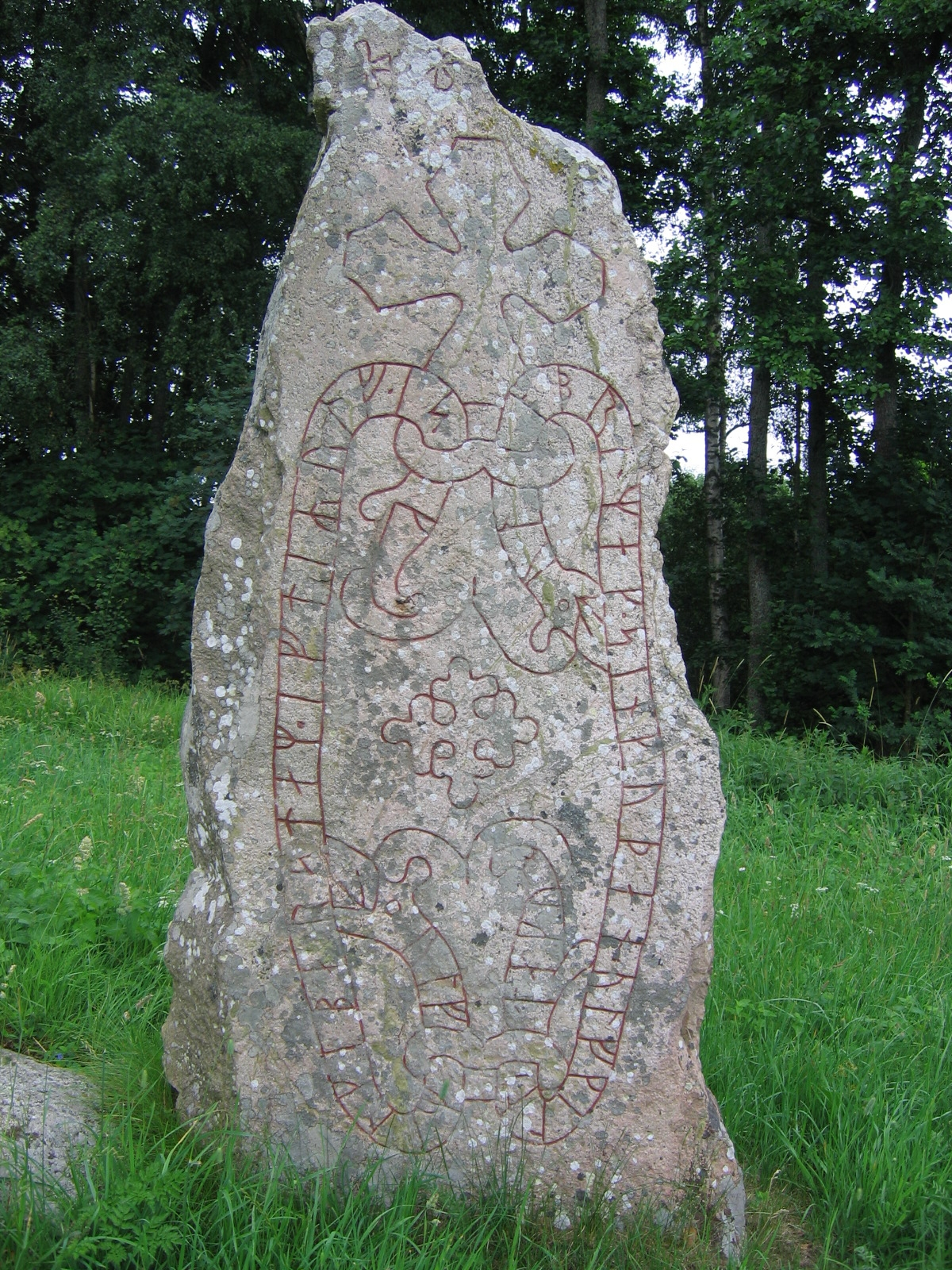
U 161

This runestone was made by Ulfr of Báristaðir in memory of Ulfr in Skolhamarr, his kinsman-by-marriage, on the request of the latter Ulf's son Ulfke(ti)ll. The design of the inscription is very similar to that of U 226 at Arkils tingstad except that two crosses have been added in the area enclosed by the two serpents.

The first normalization is Old West Norse, the second is Runic Swedish.

ulfʀ · iuk i barstam · iftiʀ · ulf · i skulobri · mak · sin · kuþan · ulfkil lit akua
Ulfr {} hjó í Báristǫðum {} eptir {} Ulf {} í Skolhamri, {} mág {} sinn {} góðan. {} Ulfkell lét hǫggva.
Ulfʀ {} hiogg i Baristam {} æftiʀ {} Ulf {} i Skulhambri, {} mag {} sinn {} goðan. {} Ulfkell let haggva.
Ulfr of Báristaðir cut (the stone) in memory of Ulfr in Skolhamarr, his good kinsman-by-marriage. Ulfkell had (it) cut.

== See also ==
- History of Sweden
- List of runestones
- Norrtil Runestones

== Sources ==
- Rundata
- The article 5. Runriket - Risbyle on the website of the Stockholm County Museum, retrieved July 7, 2007.
