= Arkils tingstad =

Archaeological site in Uppsala County, Sweden

Coordinates: 59°31′03″N 18°03′12″E

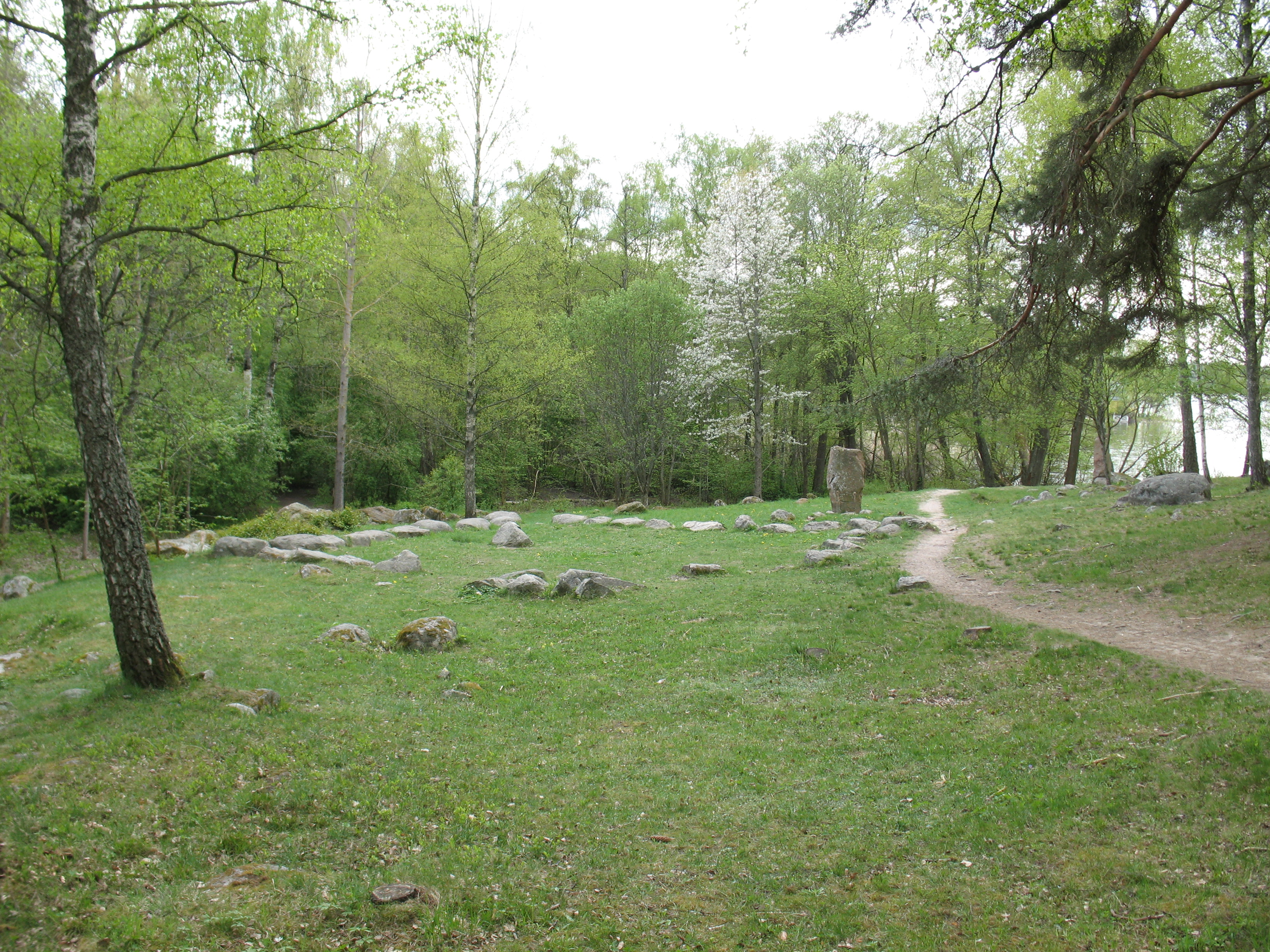
The assembly location. To the right of the stone formation, the two runestones can be seen, and in the background there is the lake.

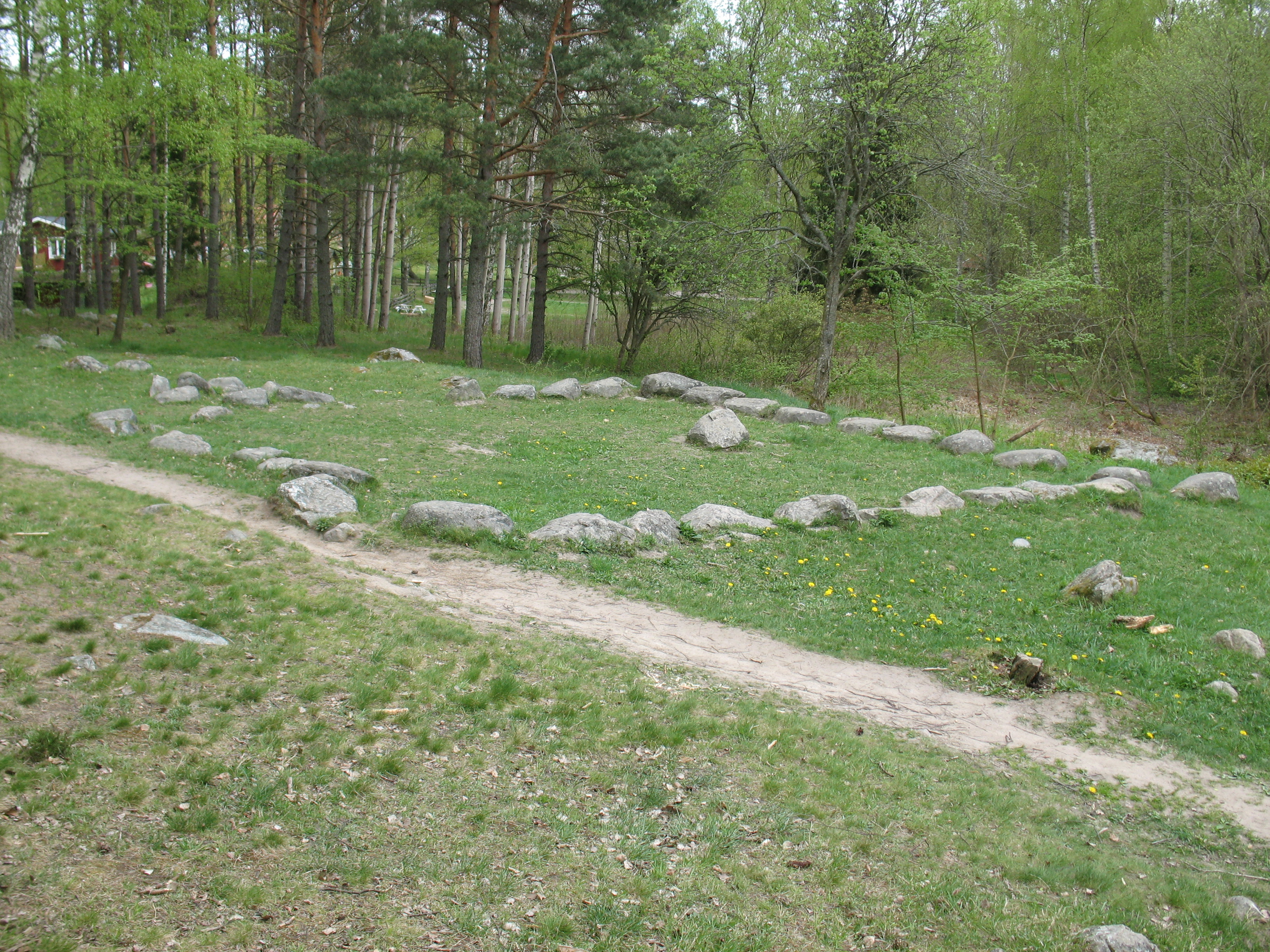
The stone formation.

Arkils tingstad ("Assembly location of Arkil") is the remains of the Viking Age thing or assembly location of a hundred in Uppland, Sweden. It is situated on the outskirts of Stockholm. The remains consist of a rectangular stone formation and two runestones.

The runestones and the assembly location were created by the Skålhamra clan who also had the two Risbyle Runestones made across the lake near their estate. It consequently appears that they owned land on both sides of the lake. They also made the runestone U 100 at a path in the forest.

Scholars disagree on the function of a Viking Age assembly location. According to one view, all the people in the vicinity assembled there in order to reach agreements and to mete out justice. Another view sees the assemblies as meetings for the chieftains only who merely stated what they had decided to do and where they interrogated and punished their subordinates.

Before the Christianization of Scandinavia, the pagan blóts were performed by chieftains and magnates. When Christianity arrived, the Christian rites and especially baptism were central to the community. It is possible that the Skålhamra clan created the assembly location in order to have settlements around the lake baptized by priests from Sigtuna. The inscriptions suggest that the location had no continuity from Norse paganism.

Based on the styles of the inscriptions, the assembly location was created in the 1010s, and the runestones are some decades older than the Jarlabanke runestone U 212 which tells of the creation of another assembly location.

== Runestones ==
Below follows a presentation of the runestones based on information collected from the Rundata project, organized according to location. The transcriptions from runic inscriptions into standardized Old Norse are in the Swedish and Danish dialect to facilitate comparison with the inscriptions, while the English translation provided by Rundata give the names in standard dialect (the Icelandic and Norwegian dialect).

=== U 225 ===
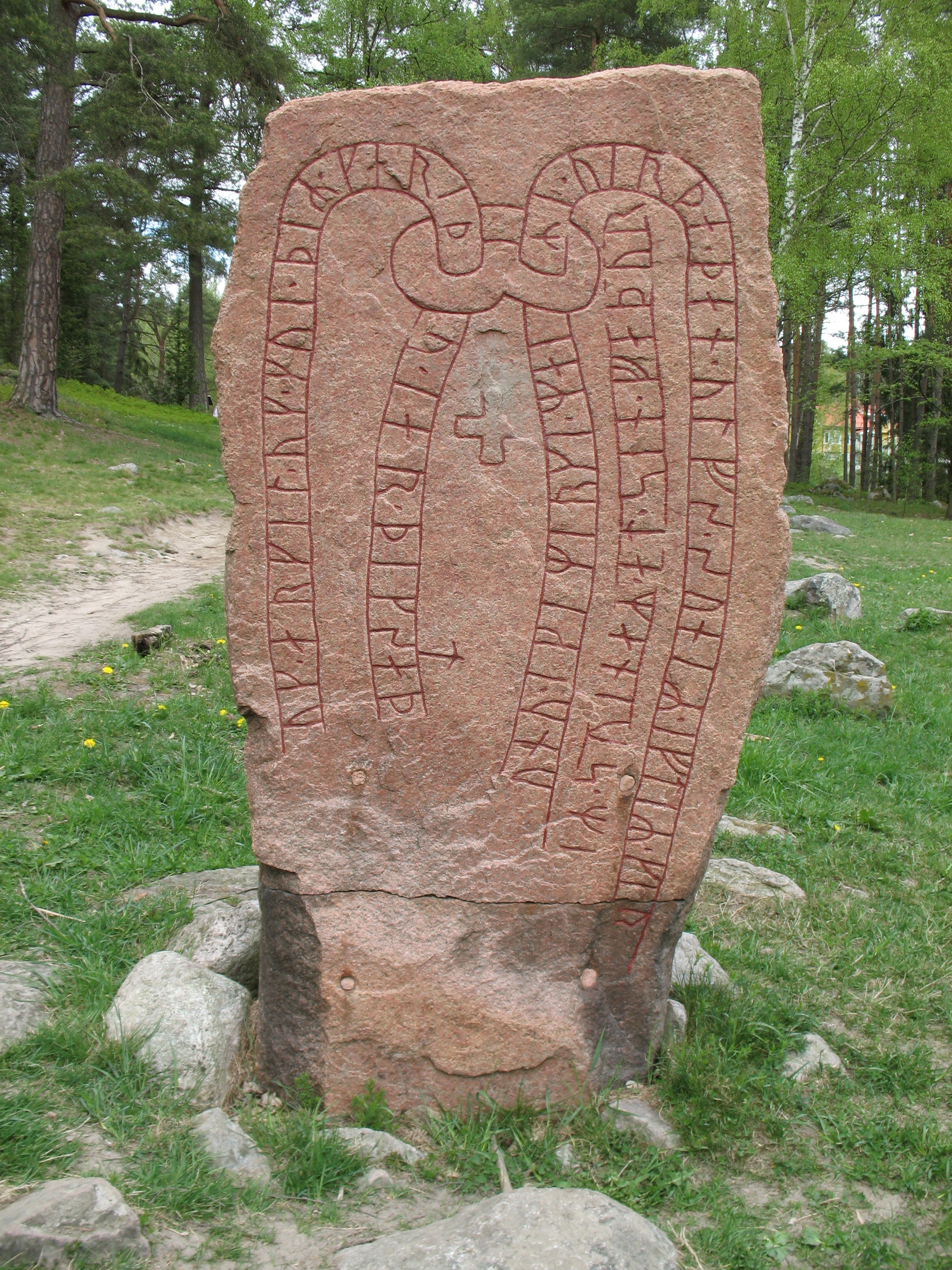
U 225.

The two runestones constitute a twin monument such that the text on U 225 is to be read as continuing on U 226. Both runestones were carved by a runemaster with the normalized name of Gunnar, with U 225 classified as being in runestone style RAK. This is the classification for inscriptions with a runic text has no dragon or serpent heads and the ends of the runic bands are straight.

... uk * arkil * uk * kui * þiʀ * kariþu * iar * þikstaþ ... ...unu * iki mirki * maiʀi * uirþa * þan * ulfs * suniʀ * iftiʀ * kir... ...iʀ * suinaʀ * at * sin * faþur
[Ulfkell](?) ok {} Arnkell {} ok {} Gyi {} þæiʀ {} gærðu {} hiar {} þingstað ... [M]unu {} æigi mærki {} mæiʀi {} verða, {} þan {} Ulfs {} syniʀ {} æftiʀ {} gær[ðu], [sniall]iʀ {} svæinaʀ, {} at {} sinn {} faður.
Ulfkell(?) and Arnkell and Gýi, they made the Assembly-place here ... No landmark will be more (great), than (the one) the sons of Ulfr made in (his) memory; able lads in memory of their father.

=== U 226 ===
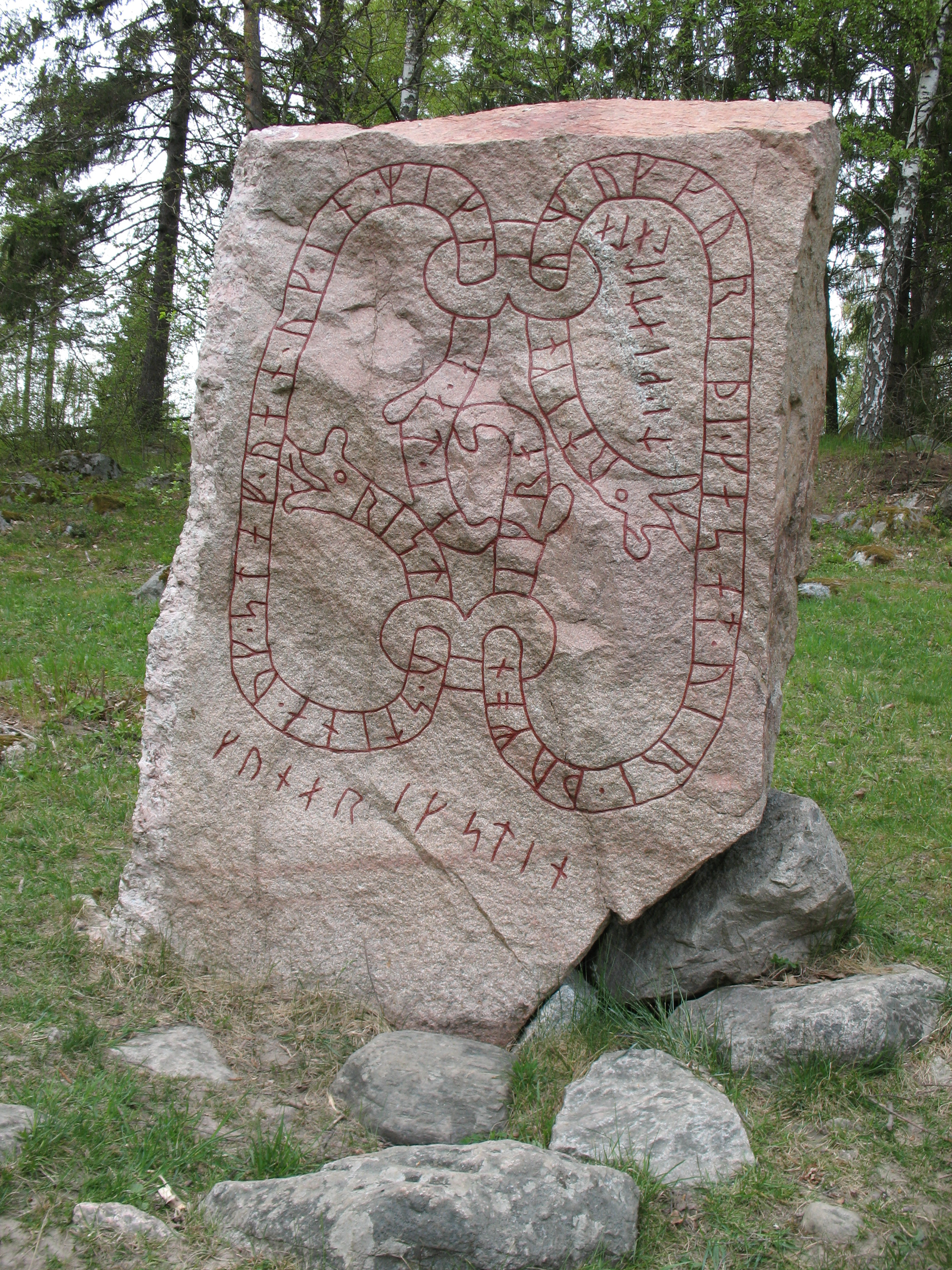
U 226.

This runestone was also made by Gunnar and is classified as being carved in runestone style Pr1. This is the classification, which is also known as Ringerike style, for those inscriptions that have runic bands that end in serpent or animal heads depicted in profile. In the text there is some question regarding whether the Old Norse words i grati should be translated as meaning "in tears" or "in lament," meaning that Gyríðr composed poetry in mourning her deceased husband. It has been suggested that the inscription Vg 59 in Norra Härene describes another widow who may have composed a lament. U 226 is the only surviving runestone signed by Gunnar, although more than forty other inscriptions have been attributed to him based on stylistic analysis. The runes kunar ik stin for "Gunnarr cut the stone" are carved in a line below the rest of the inscription.

ristu * stina * uk * staf * uan * uk * in * mikla * at * iartiknum uk kuriþi * kas at * uiri * þu mon i krati * kiatit lata kunar ik stin
Ræistu {} stæina {} ok {} staf {} unnu(?) {} ok {} inn {} mikla {} at {} iarteknum. Ok Gyriði {} gats at {} veri. {} Þy man i grati {} getit lata. Gunnarr hiogg stæin.
(They) raised stones and produced the staff(?) and the great signs (of acclaim); Gyríðr also cherished her husband: he will therefore be commemorated in weeping. Gunnarr cut the stone.

== See also ==
- List of runestones
