= Norrtil Runestones =

Swedish monuments

The Norrtil Runestones are two monuments listed in Rundata as U 410 and U 411, standing at Norrtil, Saint Olovs parish, Uppland, Sweden. Both runestones were erected at the second part of 11th century along the ancient road leading from Sigtuna to already existed at that time settlement of Til.

== U 410 ==
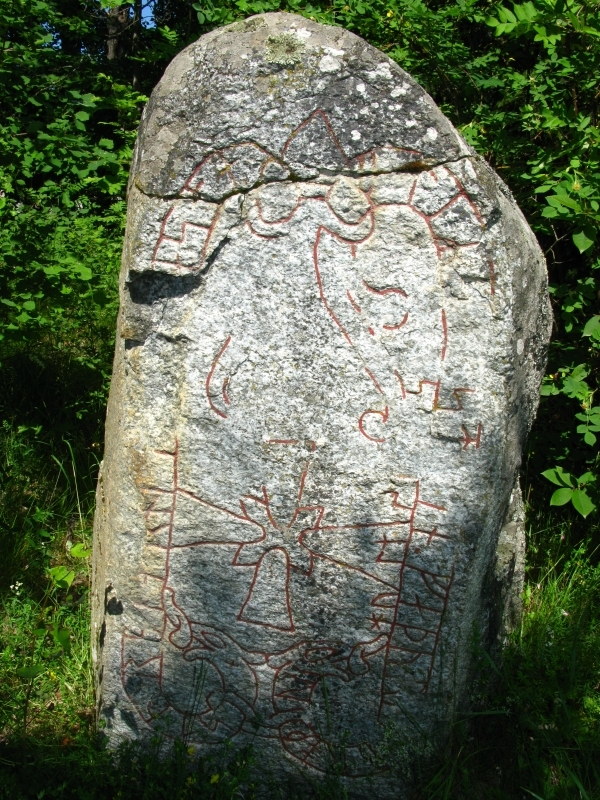
Runic stone U 410

The stone is located on the south-eastern side of a hill 59°37′28.92″N 17°45′3.96″E, which was evidently a local burial ground in the Viking Age. Several graves of that period marked by stone settings are in the near proximity to the monument. Material is grey granite. Height — 1.55 m, width — 0.75 m.

The inscription is partly damaged due to the stone surface is subject to flaking. Lost text fragments fortunately reconstructed with help of older drawings, the first of which was made by Johan Hadorph in 1682. Runes are carved on the bodies of two serpents which have their heads and tails bound together. The cross is placed in the middle.

=== Transliteration into Latin characters ===
× sturbiarn • l[it • rais]a . stai . . . ftiʀ [ • ] s[ik]st[a]in • faþur - - - broþur hulmst . . . [n]s

=== Old Norse transcription ===
Styrbiorn let ræisa stæi[n æ]ftiʀ Sigstæin, faður [sinn], broður Holmst[æi]ns.

=== English translation ===
Styrbjôrn had the stone raised in memory of Sigsteinn, his father, Holmsteinn's brother.

== U 411 ==
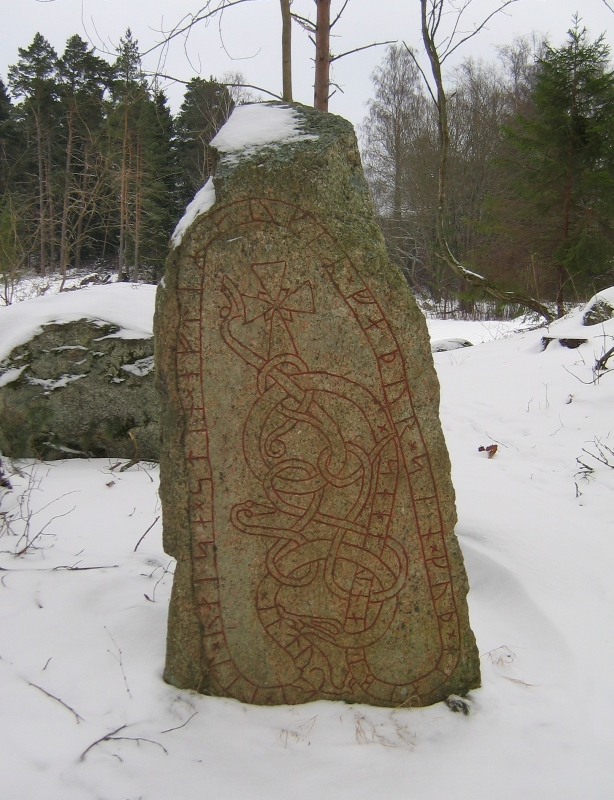
Runic stone U 411

The monument is standing 190 m west of the U 410 stone 59°37′29.64″N 17°44′52.44″E. Material is pink granite, height — 1.74 m, width — 0.93 m.

The text is carved on a serpent. Its body forms a loop following the contour of the stone. Inside the loop under the cross the serpent's head and tail many times interlaced with a snake of smaller size. All runes well preserved.

=== Transliteration into Latin characters ===
× ilturi × lit × raisa × stin × eftiʀ × sukiʀ × faþur × sin × kuþ × hialbi • ant • ahns ×

=== Old Norse transcription ===
ilturi let ræisa stæin æftir Syggæiʀ(?), faður sinn. Guð hialpi and hans.

=== English translation ===
<ilturi> had the stone raised in memory of Siggeirr/Seygeirr, his father. May God help his spirit.

The U 411 is the only runic stone bearing the personal name ilturi. Moreover this name is unknown from other Scandinavian Medieval sources. Yet in the list of landmarks between Swedish provinces Värend and Njudung, dated by 1320, the place-name Illdorabech was presented, probably comprising the personal name Illdore.

== See also ==
- History of Sweden
- List of runestones
- Risbyle Runestones
