= Västra Nöbbelöv Runestone =

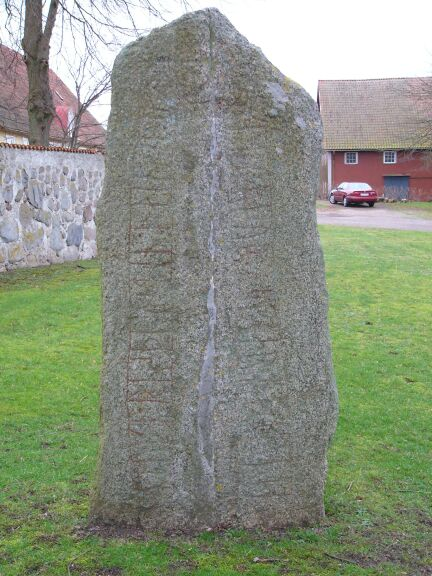
DR 278 in the churchyard.

The Västra Nöbbelöv Runestone, listed as DR 278 in the Rundata catalog, is a Viking Age memorial runestone located in Västra Nöbbelöv, which is about 3 kilometers east of Skivarp, Skåne County, Sweden, and was in the historic province of Scania.

== Description ==
The inscription on the Västra Nöbbelöv Runestone consists of runic text in the younger futhark within a single text band that runs up the stone, arches over, and then goes to the ground. The inscription is classified as being carved in runestone style RAK, which is the oldest style. This is the classification for runic text where the text bands have straight ends and without any attached beast or serpent heads. The runestone, which is 2.3 meters in height, was discovered around 1745 split into two pieces at a rectory, and has been repaired and raised on the church grounds.

The runic text states that the stone was raised by Tóki in memory of his brother Auðgi. The name Auðgi is given some prominence in the inscription with its placement at the top of the arch in the runic text. The text describes the deceased man Auðgi as being "a very good thegn" or "þegn," with the runes for thegn no longer readable on the stone. The term thegn was used in the late Viking Age in Sweden and Denmark to describe a class of retainer. About fifty memorial runestones described the deceased as being a thegn. Of these, the runic text on sixteen other runestones uses the same Old Norse phrase harða goðan þegn or "a very good Þegn," including Vg 59 in Norra Härene, Vg 62 in Ballstorp, Vg 102 in Håle gamla, Vg 113 in Lärkegape, Vg 115 in Stora Västölet, Vg 151 in Eggvena, Vg NOR1997;27 in Hols, DR 86 in Langå, DR 106 in Ørum, DR 115 in Randers, DR 121 in Asferg, DR 123 in Glenstrup, DR 130 in Giver, DR 213 in Skovlænge, DR 294 in Baldringe, and DR 343 in Östra Herrestads. In addition, four inscriptions use a different word order, þegn harða goðan, including Vg 74 in Skolgården, Vg 152 in Håkansgården, Vg 157 in Storegården, and Vg 158 in Fänneslunda.

The stone is known locally as the Västra Nöbbelövstenen. It has been given a Danish Rundata listing as Scania was part of the historic Denmark.

== Inscription ==
: tuki : risþi : stin : þainsi : iftiʀ : auþka : bruþur : sin : harþa : kuþan : ¶ ----
{} Tóki {} reisti {} stein {} þenna {} eptir {} Auðga, {} bróður {} sinn, {} harða {} góðan {} {} [þegn].
{} Toki {} resþi {} sten {} þænsi {} æftiʀ {} Øþga, {} broþur {} sin, {} harþa {} goþan {} {} [þægn].
Tóki raised this stone in memory of Auðgi, his brother, a very good [þegn].

== See also ==
- List of runestones
