= Ballstorp Runestone =

Viking Age memorial

Coordinates: 58.2053°N 13.2316°E

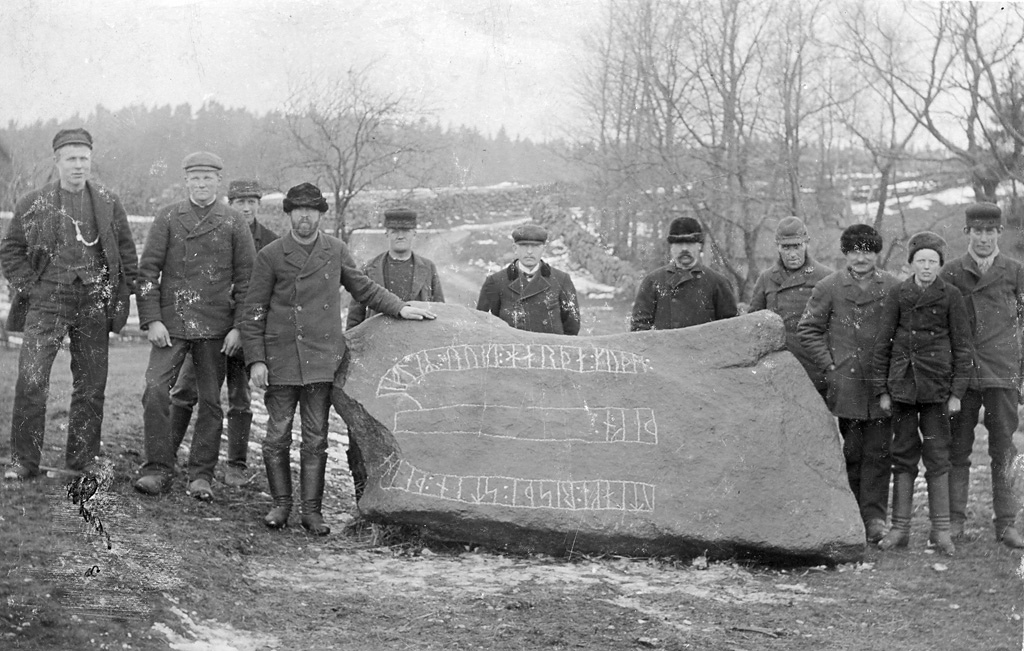
The Ballstorp Runestone shortly after its discovery in 1900.

The Ballstorp Runestone, listed as Vg 62 in the Rundata catalog, is a Viking Age memorial runestone located on the grounds of the ruins of a church in Ballstorp, which is about 8 kilometers northwest of Floby, Västra Götaland County, Sweden, which is in the historic province of Västergötland.

== Description ==
The inscription on Vg 62, which is about 1.5 meters in height and made of gneiss, consists of runic text in the younger futhark within a band that forms an arch and a central vertical text band with a single word that hangs from the arch. The inscription is classified as being carved in runestone style RAK, which is the classification for the oldest style where the text bands have straight ends without any attached beast or serpent heads. The runestone was discovered in a bridge in 1900. Before the historic significance of runestones was understood, they were often reused as materials in the construction of bridges, walls, and buildings. The stone was then raised near the ruins of an old church in 1901. At that time, a new runic text was added on the other side of the stone by a local antiquarian, stating tina stin ar hita ok rist or MCCCCI af Ioan fron Stomin or "this stone is found and raised in 1901 by Johan from Stommen."

The runic text states that the stone was originally raised by Útlagi in memory of Øyvind. The relationship between these men is not described. The text describes the deceased man Øyvind as being "a very good thegn" or "þegn," with the runes þikn for "thegn" emphasized by their central placement. The term thegn was used in the late Viking Age in Sweden and Denmark to describe a class of retainer. About fifty memorial runestones described the deceased as being a thegn. Of these, the runic text on other sixteen runestones use the same Old Norse phrase harða goðan þegn or "a very good Þegn," including Vg 59 in Norra Härene, Vg 102 in Håle gamla, Vg 113 in Lärkegape, Vg 115 in Stora Västölet, Vg 151 in Eggvena, Vg NOR1997;27 in Hols, DR 86 in Langå, DR 106 in Ørum, DR 115 in Randers, DR 121 in Asferg, DR 123 in Glenstrup, DR 130 in Giver, DR 213 in Skovlænge, DR 278 in Västra Nöbbelöv, DR 294 in Baldringe, and DR 343 in Östra Herrestads. In addition, four inscriptions use a different word order, þegn harða goðan, include Vg 74 in Skolgården, Vg 152 in Håkansgården, Vg 157 in Storegården, and Vg 158 in Fänneslunda.

== Inscription ==
utlaki : risþi : stin : þn- iftiʀ : uuit : harþa : kuþon : þikn :
Útlagi {} reisti {} stein {} þenn[a] eptir {} Eyvind, {} harða {} góðan {} þegn. {}
Utlagi {} ræisti {} stæin {} þenn[a] æftiʀ {} Øyvind, {} harða {} goðan {} þegn. {}
Útlagi raised this stone in memory of Eyvindr, a very good Þegn.

== See also ==
- List of runestones
