= Uppland Runic Inscription 100 =

Coordinates: 59.4333°N 17.9500°E

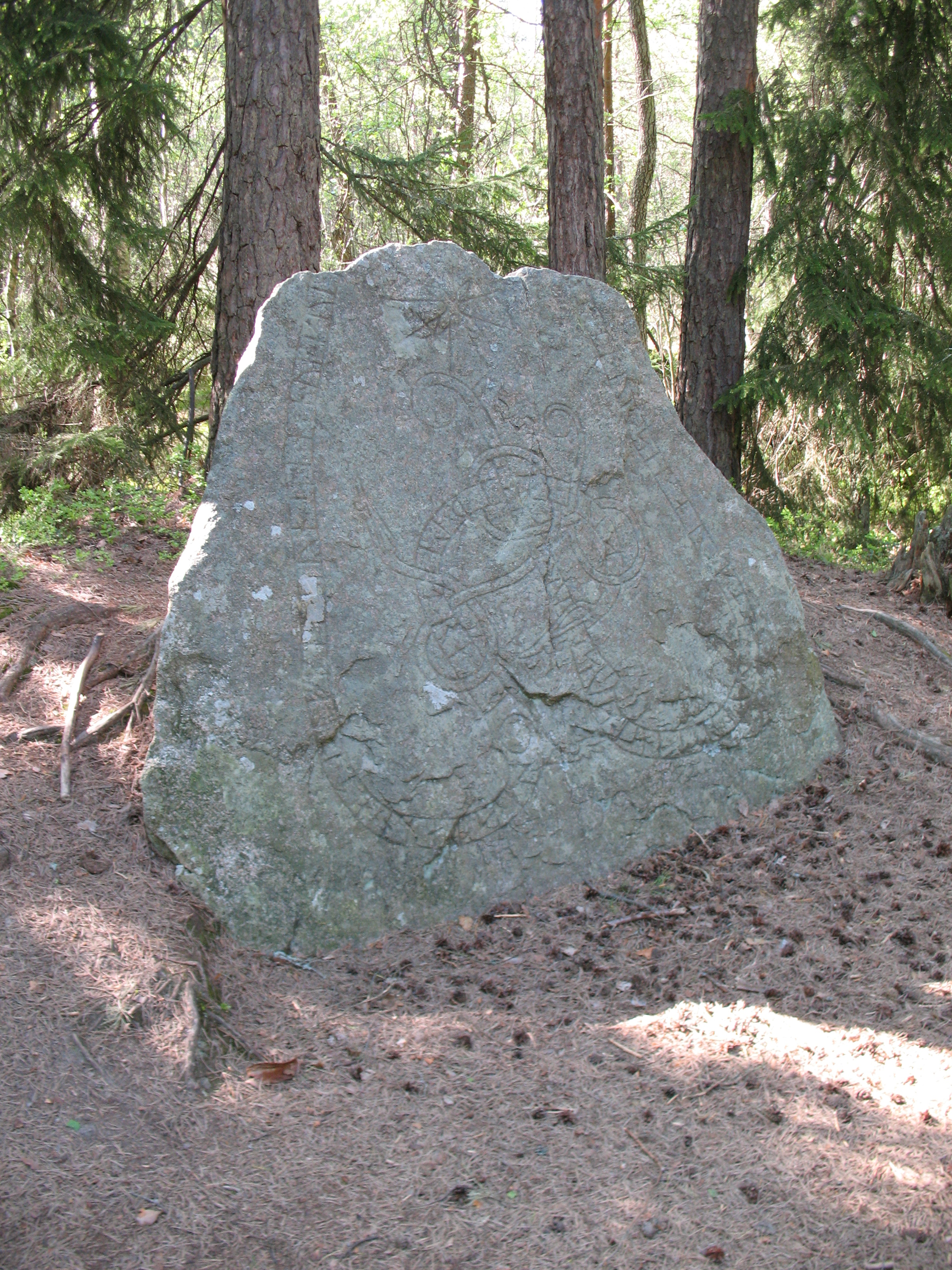
- Created: 11th Century
- Discovered: Skälby, Uppland, Sweden
- Rundata ID: U 100

Text – Native
- Old Norse : See article.

Translation
- See article.

Uppland Runic Inscription 100 is the Rundata designation for a memorial runestone that is located in the forest where a path meets a bog near Skälby, which is about two kilometers northeast of Sollentuna, Stockholm County, Sweden, which was part of the historical province of Uppland.

== Description ==
This runestone, which is made of granite and is 2.1 meters in height, has an inscription which consists of runic text within serpent bands and a Christian cross. It is classified as being carved in runestone style Pr4, which is part of the general Urnes style of Scandinavian animal art. This runestone style is characterized by slim and stylized animals that are interwoven into tight patterns. The animal heads are typically seen in profile with slender almond-shaped eyes and upwardly curled appendages on the noses and the necks.

The runestone belongs to a number of runestones that were raised by the influential Skålhamra family, which also had runestones made at Arkils tingstad and who commissioned the Risbyle Runestones.

== Inscription ==
Transliteration of runic text into Latin letters:

× guriþ × lit × raisa × stain × at * ulfkel × sun × sin × auk * kui * (a)... ... broþur * sin × auk × at × hulmtisi * sustur * sina ×

Old Norse transcription:

Gyrið let ræisa stæin at Ulfkel, sun sinn, ok Gyi ... ... broður sinn ok at Holmdisi, systur sina.

English translation:

Gyríðr had the stone raised in memory of Ulfkell, her son, and Gýi (did?) ... ... their brother, and in memory of Holmdís, their sister.

== Gallery ==
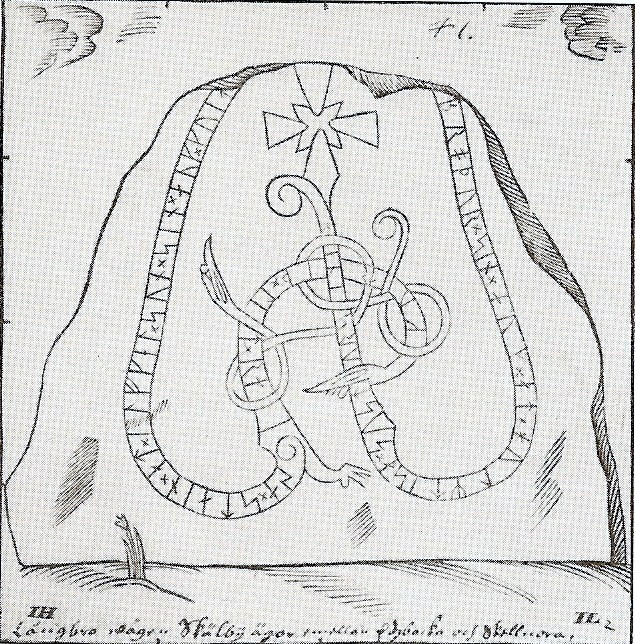
17th century drawing.

== See also ==
- List of runestones
