= Asferg Runestone =

Viking Age memorial runestone

Coordinates: 55.6749°N 12.5755°E

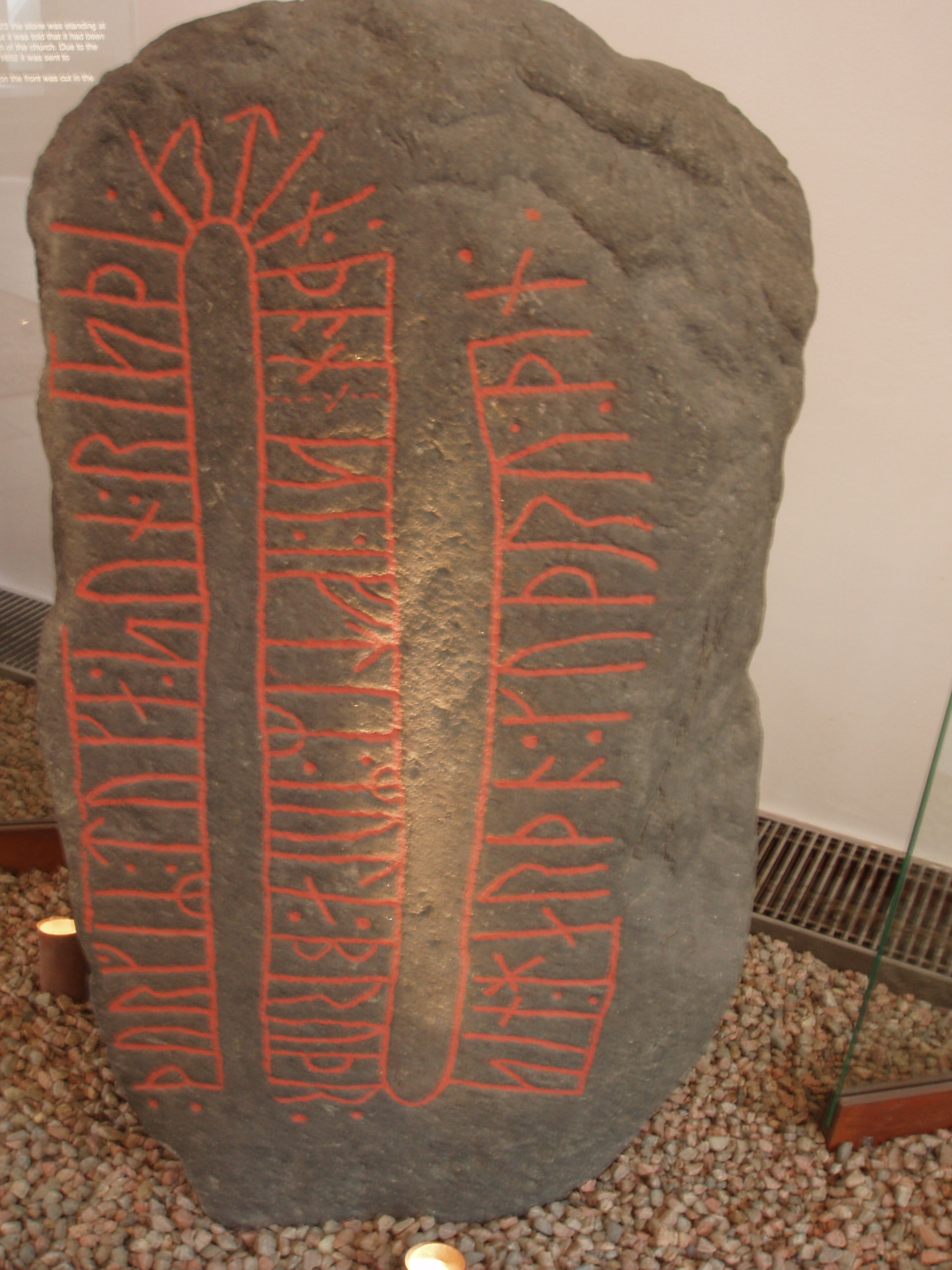
DR 121 was discovered in 1795.

The Asferg Runestone, listed as DR 121 in the Rundata catalog, is a Viking Age memorial runestone found at Asferg, which is about 10 km (6 miles) northeast of Randers, Aarhus County, Region Midtjylland, Denmark.

== Description ==
The inscription on DR 121, which is about 1.5 m (5 ft) in height and made of granite, consists of runic text in the younger futhark within a band that loops to form three rows of text. The inscription is classified as being carved in runestone style RAK, which is the classification for the oldest style where the text bands have straight ends without any attached beast or serpent heads. The runestone was discovered in 1795 at a barrow in Asferg, but was still reused as a paving stone near a local mill. Before the historic significance of runestones was understood, they were often reused as materials in the construction of churches, bridges, and roads. The stone was purchased by the Danish Antiquities Commission in 1810 and shipped to Copenhagen in 1825. Today, it is displayed at the National Museum of Denmark.

The runic text, which is read boustrophedonically from the lower left, states that the stone was raised by a man named Þorgeirr in memory of his brother Múli. The text describes the deceased man Múli as being "a very good thegn" or "þegn". The term thegn was used in the late Viking Age in Sweden and Denmark to describe a class of retainer. About fifty memorial runestones described the deceased as being a thegn. Of these, the runic text on other sixteen runestones use the same Old Norse phrase harða goðan þegn or "a very good thegn", including Vg 59 in Norra Härene, Vg 62 in Ballstorp, Vg 102 in Håle gamla, Vg 113 in Lärkegape, Vg 115 in Stora Västölet, Vg 151 in Eggvena, Vg NOR1997;27 in Hols, DR 86 in Langå, DR 106 in Ørum, DR 115 in Randers, DR 123 in Glenstrup, DR 130 in Giver, DR 213 in Skovlænge, DR 278 in Västra Nöbbelöv, DR 294 in Baldringe, and DR 343 in Östra Herrestads. In addition, four inscriptions use a different word order, þegn harða goðan, including Vg 74 in Skolgården, Vg 152 in Håkansgården, Vg 157 in Storegården, and Vg 158 in Fänneslunda. The runemaster used a punctuation mark consisting of two dots (":") to separate each word of the text.

The stone is known locally as the Asferg-sten.

== Inscription ==
=== Transliteration of the runes into Latin characters ===
: þurgiʀ : tuka : sun : risþi : stin : þonnsi : iftiʀ : mula : bruþr : ¶ sin : harþo : kuþru : þin :

=== Transcription into Old Norse ===
Þorgiʀ Toka sun resþi sten þænsi æftiʀ Mula, broþur sin, harþa goþan þægn.

=== Translation in English ===
Þorgeirr son of Tóki raised this stone in memory of Múli, his brother, a very good thegn.
