= Stenkvista runestone =

Coordinates: 59.3145°N 16.5326°E

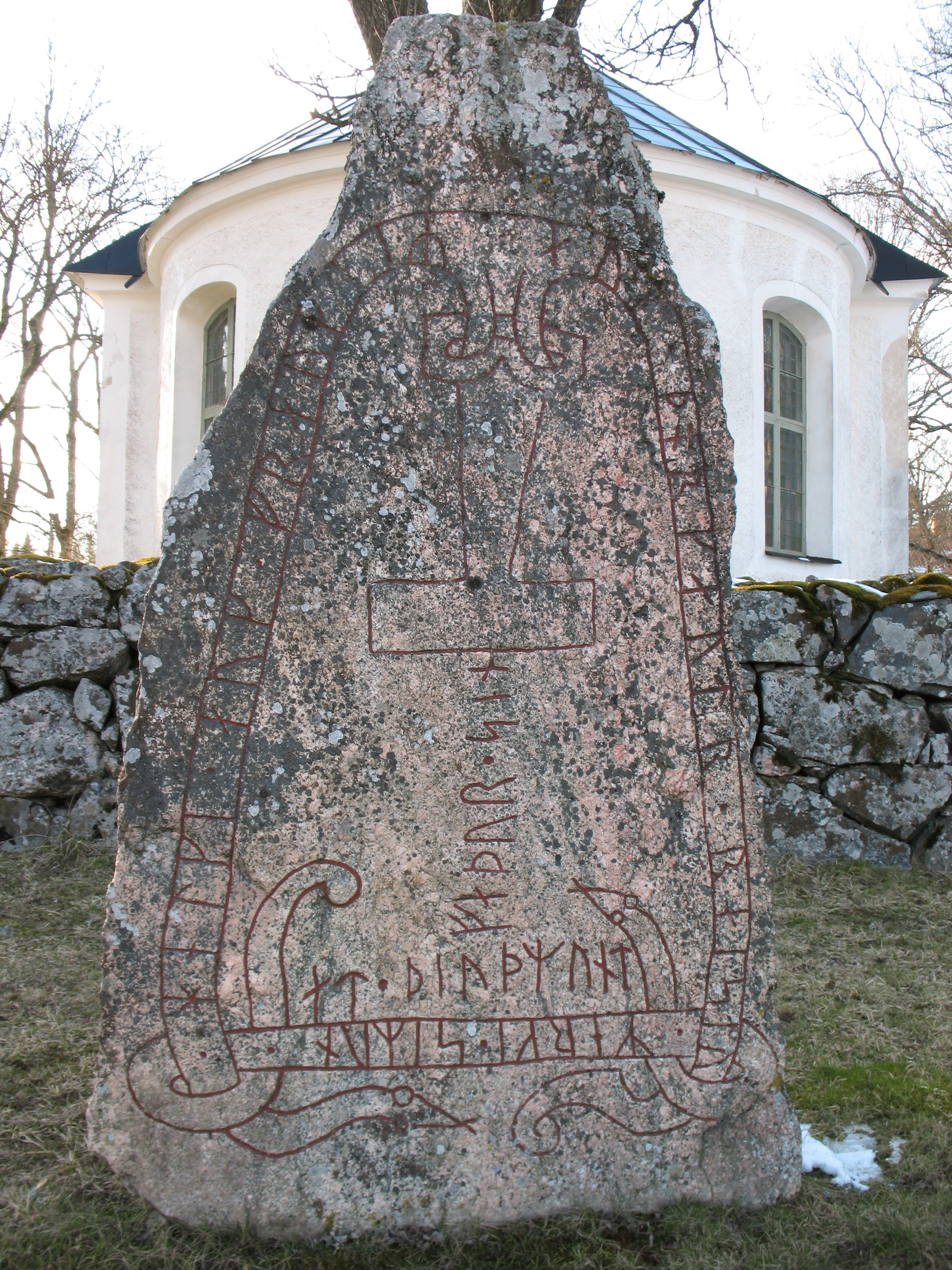
The Stenkvista runestone in Södermanland, Sweden, with its Thor's hammer.

The Stenkvista runestone, designated as runic inscription Sö 111 in the Rundata catalog, is a memorial runestone located near the church at Stenkvista, which is two kilometers east of Skogstorp, Södermanland County, Sweden, which was formerly part of the historic Södermanland, and which features a depiction of Thor's hammer, Mjöllnir. This runestone is one of several runestones in Scandinavia that has a dedication to Thor. While the tradition of carving inscriptions into boulders began in the 4th century and lasted into the 12th century, most runestones in Scandinavia date from the late Viking Age.

== Description ==
The Stenkvista runestone, which currently lies in a churchyard, is made of granite and is 2.2 meters in height. It is classified as being in runestone style Fp. This is the classification for inscriptions where the runic text is characterized by runic bands that end with serpent or animal heads depicted as seen from above. The runemaster who carved this runestone placed a dot between the words in the runic text, arranged the design so that the runes þiuþmunt for the man's name Þjóðmundr and faþur * sin for the words fôður sinn ("their father") are located below the Thor's hammer. Thor's hammer was used on several memorial runestones in Sweden and Denmark, perhaps as a parallel to or a pagan reaction to the use of the cross by Christians. Other surviving runestones or inscriptions depicting Thor's hammer include runestones U 1161 in Altuna, Sö 86 in Åby, Vg 113 in Lärkegapet, Öl 1 in Karlevi, DR 26 in Laeborg, DR 48 in Hanning, DR 120 in Spentrup, and DR 331 in Gårdstånga.

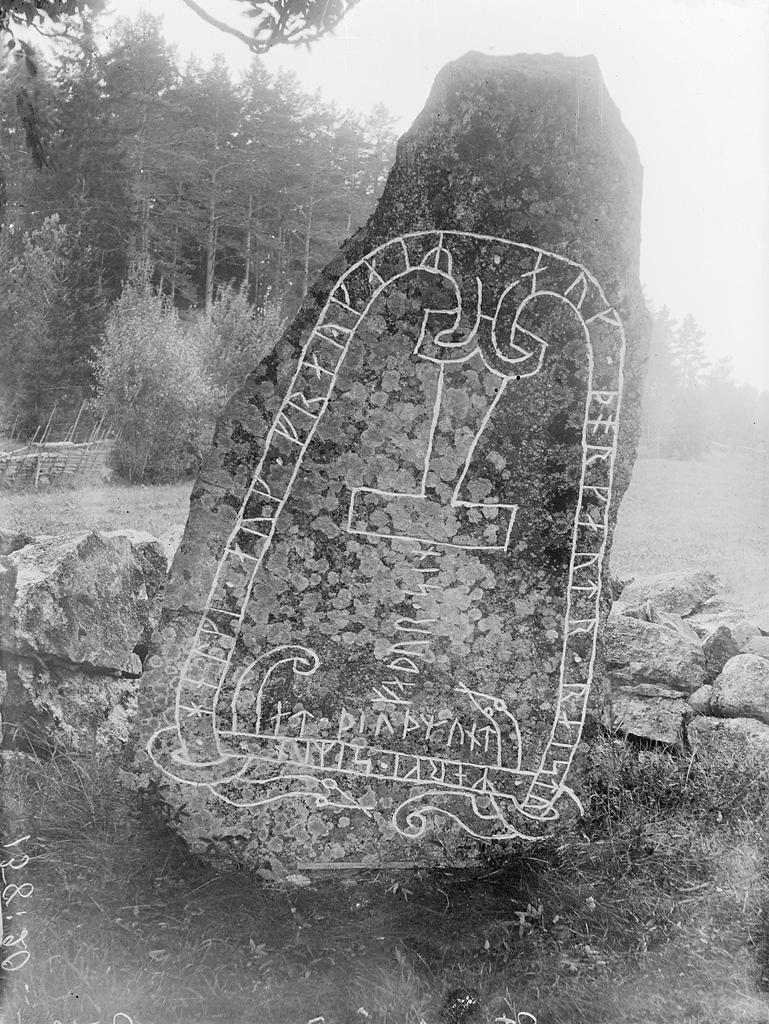
Sö 111 in 1916.

The runic text indicates that the stone is a memorial raised by three sons to their father Þjóðmundr. Two Norse pagan gods appear as theophoric name elements in two of the personal names listed in the inscription. The name Freygeirr translates as "Freyr's Spear" and Þorgautr as "Thor-Goth."

== Inscription ==
* helki * auk * fraykaiʀ * auk * þorkautr * raistu * merki * siʀun * at * þiuþmunt faþur * sin
{} Helgi {} ok {} Freygeirr {} ok {} Þorgautr {} reistu {} merki {} sírún/sírýn {} at {} Þjóðmund, fôður {} sinn.
Helgi and Freygeirr and Þorgautr raised the rune-decorated landmark in memory of Þjóðmundr, their father.
