= Laeborg Runestone =

Coordinates: 55°31′23″N 9°06′53″E

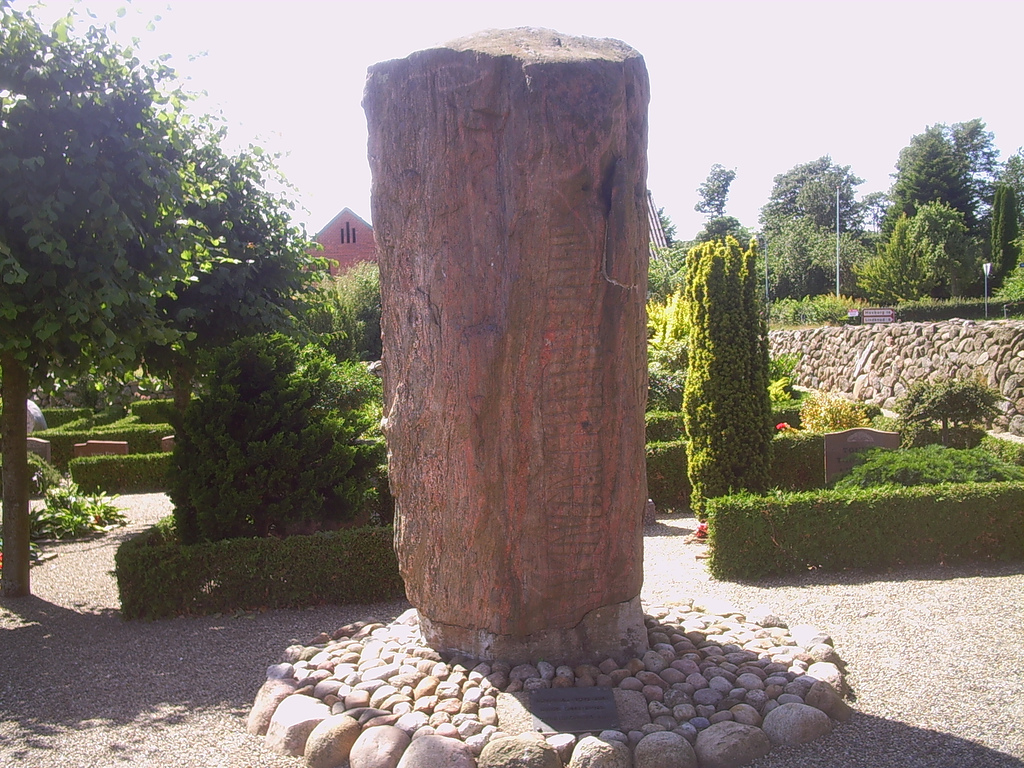
DR 26 in Læborg, Denmark.

The Læborg or Laeborg Runestone, listed as DR 26 in the Rundata catalog, is a Viking Age memorial runestone located outside of the village hall or Forsamlinghus in Læborg, which is about 3 kilometers north of Vejen, Denmark. The stone includes two depictions of the hammer of the Norse pagan god Thor.

== Description ==
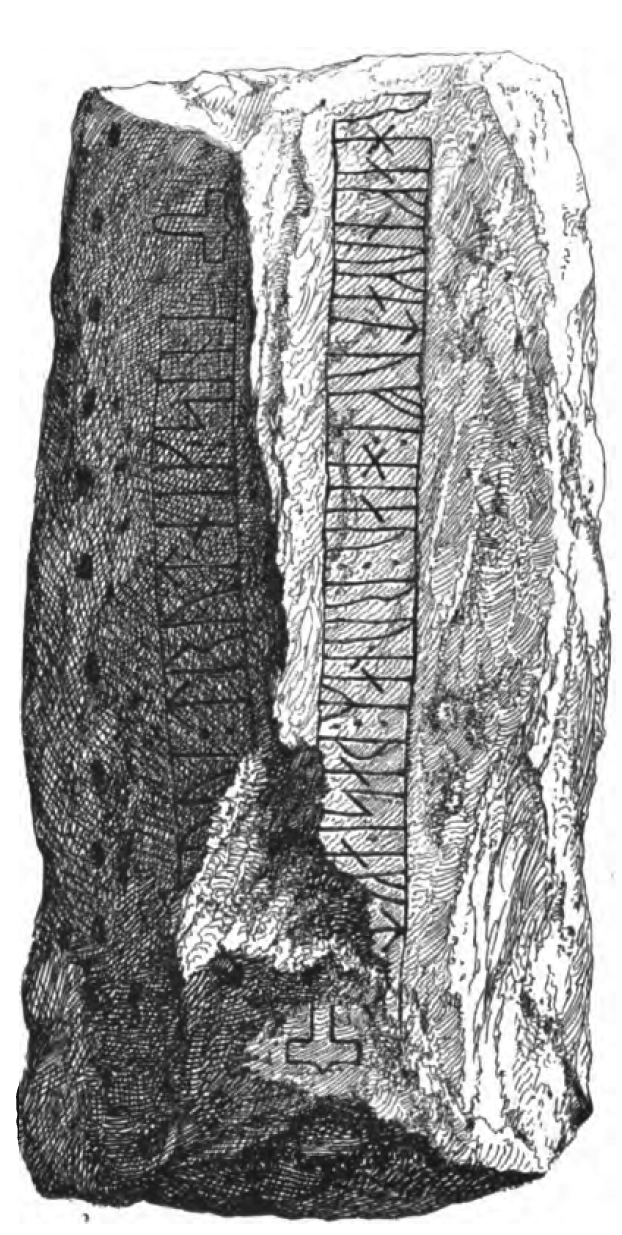
Drawing of DR 26 published in 1878.

The inscription on DR 26 consists of two lines of runic text designated as lines A and B in the younger futhark written in boustrophedon fashion on the granite stone, which is 2.36 meters in height. After each line is a depiction of a hammer, which has been interpreted as being Thor's hammer Mjöllnir. Thor's hammer was used on several memorial runestones in Sweden and Denmark, perhaps as a parallel to or a pagan reaction to the use of the cross by Christians. Other surviving runestones or inscriptions depicting Thor's hammer include runestones U 1161 in Altuna, Sö 86 in Åby, Sö 111 in Stenkvista, Vg 113 in Bjärby, Öl 1 in Karlevi, DR 48 in Skjern, DR 120 in Spentrup, and DR 331 in Gårdstånga. The depiction of the hammers on DR 26 are very similar to the hammer on DR 48. The inscription is classified as being carved in runestone style RAK, which is considered to be the oldest style. This is the classification for runic text bands with straight ends that do not have any attached serpent or beast heads. The stone was noted by Ole Worm as having been discovered around 1638 in a field north of Læborg. A portion of the top of the stone is damaged. A small fragment of the stone was discovered in 1888 and is inserted into the top of the B line of the text.

The runic text states that the stone was raised by a man named Tófi in memory of a woman named Þyrvé, which is normalized as Thyrve and sometimes as Thorvi. Thyrve is described as being his trutnik, a word meaning the wife or descendant of a trutin or "lord," which is transcribed into Old Norse as drotning and often translated as "lady." This same word is also used on DR 134 in Ravnkilde and translated as "lady." Tófi and Thyrve are also associated with Danish runestone DR 29 in Bække, which records that Tófi created a mound in honor of Thyrve, and DR 40 in Randbøl is a stone raised by Tófi in memory of his assistant named Þorgunnr. Thyrve was a common name of the period, and a different woman of that name is recorded on the Danish runestone DR 97 in Ålum. Because DR 26 is dated based upon stylistic and linguistic analysis from 900 to 950 C.E., it may also be possible that the Thyrve of DR 26 might also be the same woman that is recorded on DR 41 and DR 42 in Jelling, which describe a Thyra who is the wife of king Gorm the Old. If these Thyrve are the same woman, then the runestones may be a record of a dispute regarding inheritance between two competing Danish families. However, most scholars believe that it is more likely that DR 26 along with DR 29 refer to a different woman with the same name than the Thyra noted on the Jelling Stones DR 41 and DR 42.

The stone is known locally as the Læborgsten.

== Inscription ==
rhafnukatufi ÷ hiau ÷ runaʀ : þasi aft
Hrafnunga-Tofi {} hio {} runaʀ {} þæssi æft
Tófi, of Hrafn's lineage, made these runes in memory of

þurui ÷ trutnik : sina
Þorwi, {} drotning {} sina.
Thyre, his queen.
