= Karlevi Runestone =

Runestone in Öland, Sweden

Coordinates: 56.61°N 16.45°E

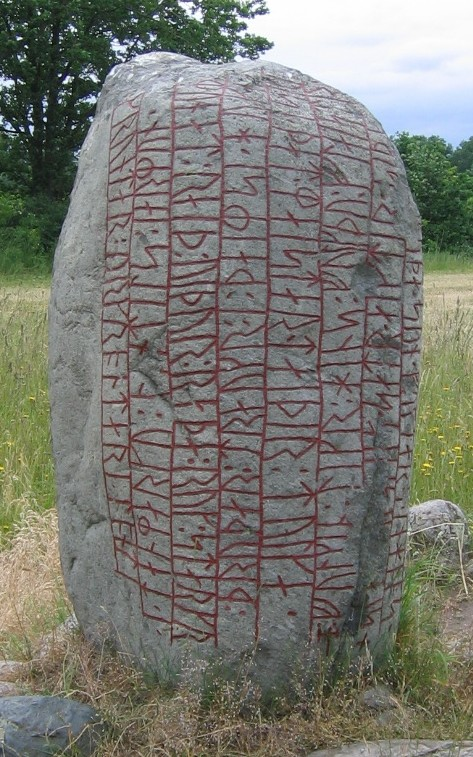
The Karlevi Runestone.

The Karlevi Runestone, designated as Öl 1 by Rundata, is commonly dated to the late 10th century and located near the Kalmarsund straight in Karlevi on the island of Öland, Sweden. It is one of the most notable and prominent runestones and constitutes the oldest record of a stanza of skaldic verse.

== Description ==
The runic inscription on the Karlevi Runestone is partly in prose, partly in verse. It is the only example of a complete scaldic stanza preserved on a runestone and is composed in the "lordly meter" the dróttkvætt. It is notable for mentioning Thor's daughter Þrúðr and Viðurr, one of the names for Odin, in kennings for "chieftain." In the second half of the stanza a reference is made to Denmark, but it is not clear what exactly this means in this poetic context.

The stone is contemporary with the Battle of the Fýrisvellir and it is consequently possible that the stone was raised by warriors who partook in it, in memory of their lord.

The inscription, which is on a granite stone that is 1.4 meters in height, is classified as being in runestone style RAK. This is the classification with inscriptions with runic text in bands that have no attached dragon or serpent heads and the ends of the runic bands are straight. The non-runic inscription on the reverse side appears to be accompanied by a small Christian cross and a Norse pagan Thor's hammer, or Mjöllnir. Other surviving runestones or inscriptions depicting Thor's hammer include runestones U 1161 in Altuna, Sö 86 in Åby, Sö 111 in Stenkvista, Vg 113 in Lärkegapet, DR 26 in Laeborg, DR 48 in Hanning, DR 120 in Spentrup, and DR 331 in Gårdstånga.

== Inscription ==
Transliteration of the runes into Latin characters, and transcription into Old Norse (the Swedish-Danish dialect):

+ s-a... --(s)- i(a)s * satr * aiftir * si(b)(a) * kuþa * sun * fultars * in hons ** liþi * sati * at * u * -ausa-þ-... +: fulkin : likr : hins : fulkþu : flaistr (:)* uisi * þat * maistar * taiþir : tulka * þruþar : traukr : i : þaimsi * huki * munat : raiþ:uiþur : raþa : ruk:starkr * i * tanmarku : --ntils : iarmun**kruntar : urkrontari : lonti
{} S[t]æ[inn] [sa]s[i] es {} sattr {} æftiʀ {} Sibba {} Goða, {} sun {} Fuldars, {} en hans {} liði {} satti {} at {} ... {} ... {} Fulginn {} liggʀ {} hinns {} fylgðu, {} flæstr {} vissi {} þat, {} mæstaʀ {} dæðiʀ {} dolga {} Þruðaʀ {} draugʀ {} i {} þæimsi {} haugi; {} munat {} Ræið-Viðurr {} raða {} rogstarkʀ {} i {} Danmarku {} [Æ]ndils {} iarmungrundaʀ {} uʀgrandaʀi {} landi.

The latter part of the inscription is metrical, and represents the following stanza:

Folginn liggr hinn's fylgðu,
—flestr vissi þat—mestar
dǽðir, dolga Þrúðar
draugr, í þeimsi haugi;
munat reið-Viðurr ráða,
rógstarkr, í Danmǫrku,
Endils jǫrmungrundar,
ørgrandari, landi.

In literal translation:

The tree of enmities of Þrúðr <valkyrja> [BATTLES > WARRIOR] whom the greatest deeds followed lies concealed in this mound; most men knew that. A more upright, strife-strong Viðurr <= Óðinn> of the chariot of the vast expanse of Endill <sea-king> [lit. (‘chariot-Viðurr of the vast expanse of Endill’) SEA > SHIP > SEA-WARRIOR] will not rule over land in Denmark.

A more idiomatic English translation of the poetic stanza is provided by Foote and Wilson:

Tree of Thrúd of hostilities, the man whom the greatest virtues accompanied - most men know that - lies buried in this mound; a more upright chariot-Vidur of wondrous-wide ground of Endil will not rule, strife-strong, land in Denmark.

The reverse side of the stone also has a non-runic inscription In nomin[e] (?) Ie[su] (?) which may mean "In the name of Jesus."

== Gallery ==
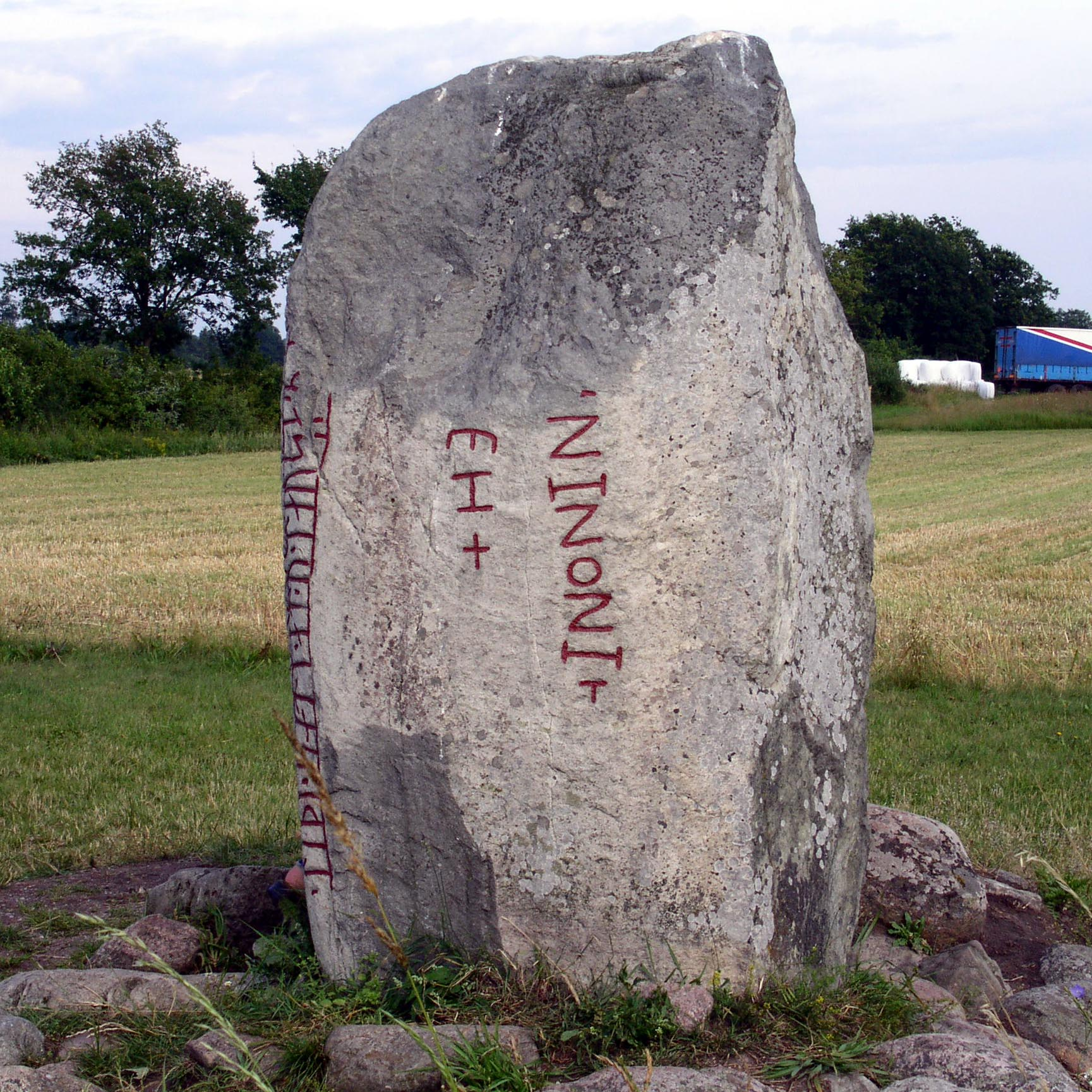
Reverse side of the runestone.

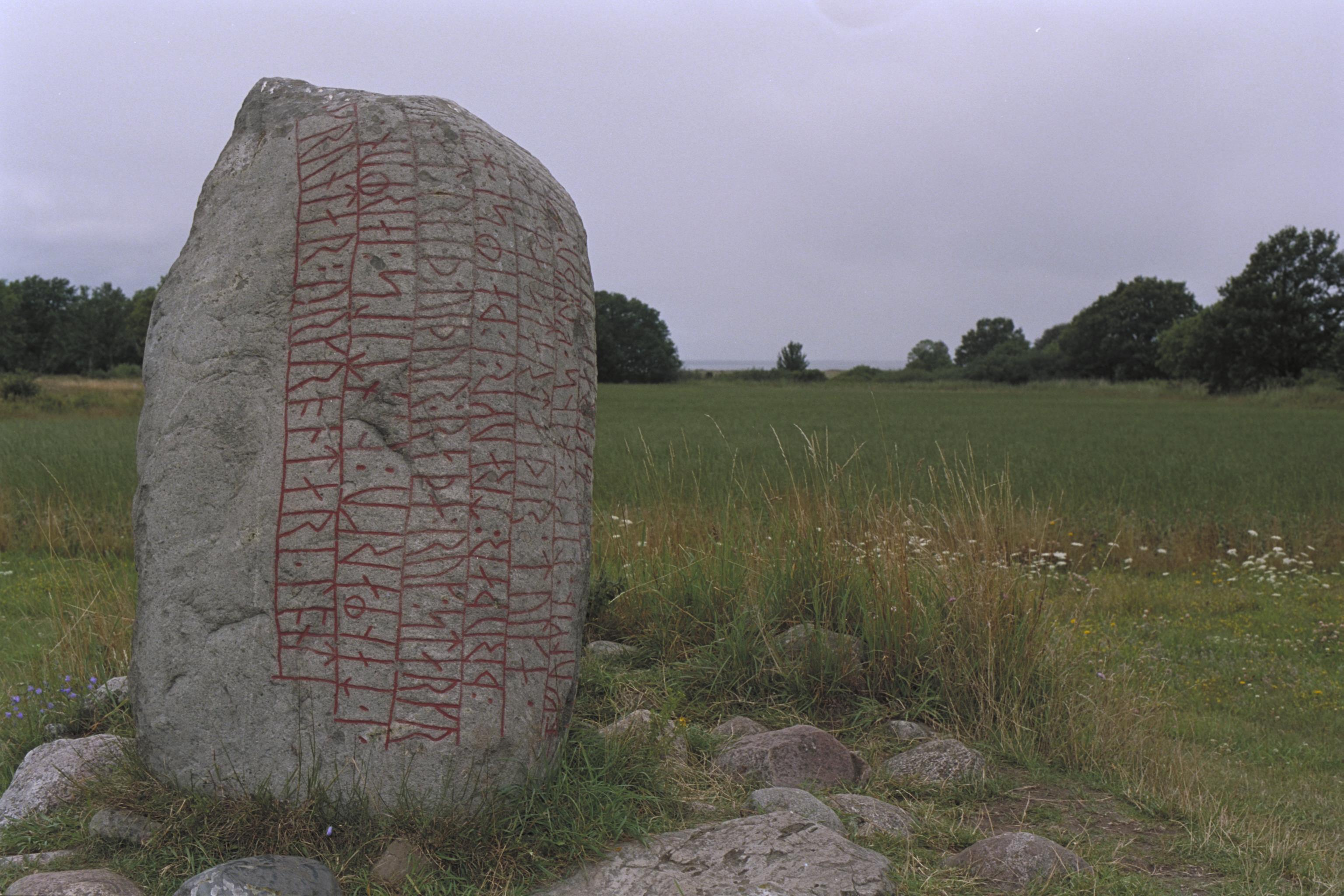
The runestone and its surroundings by the sea

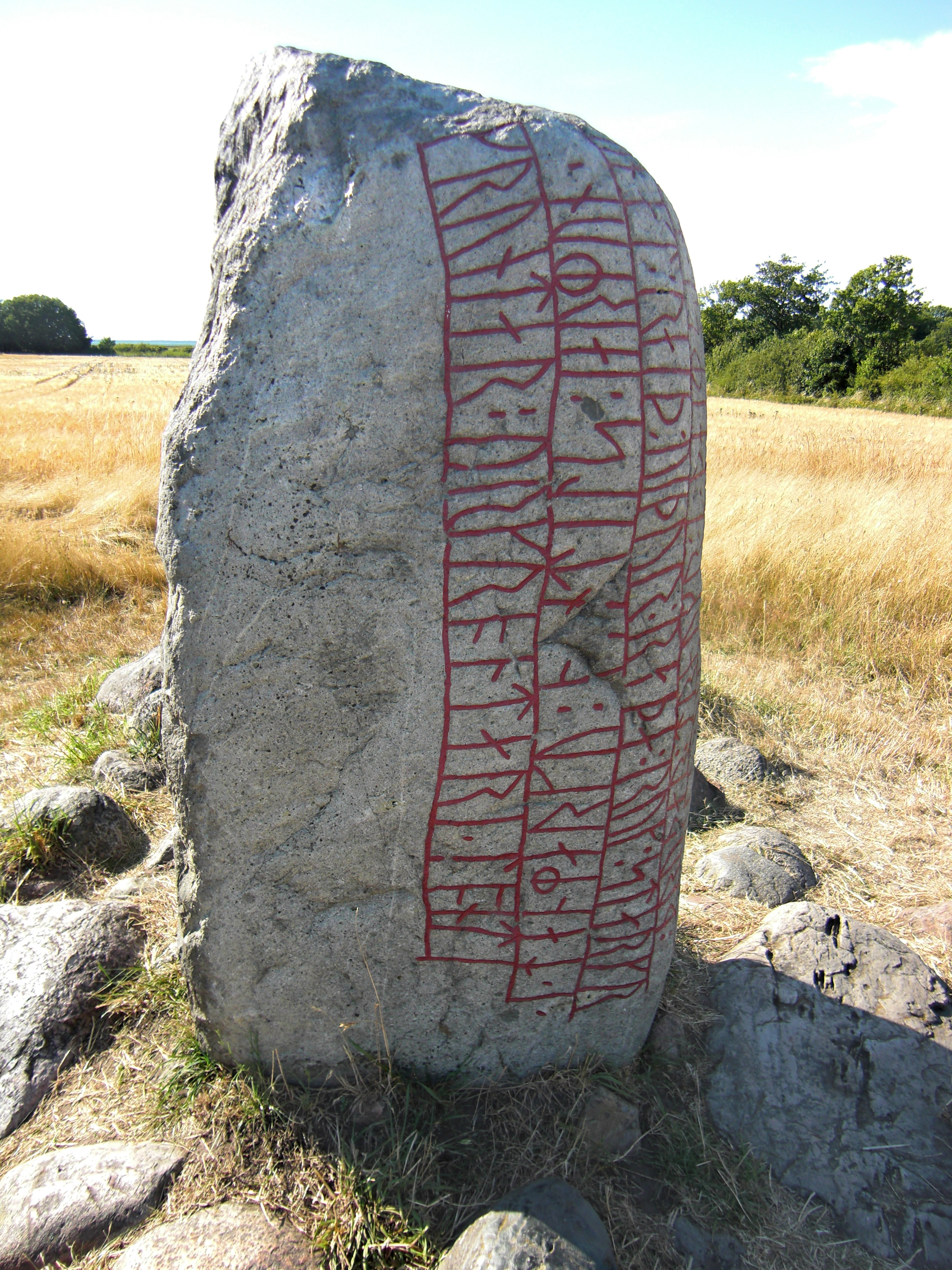

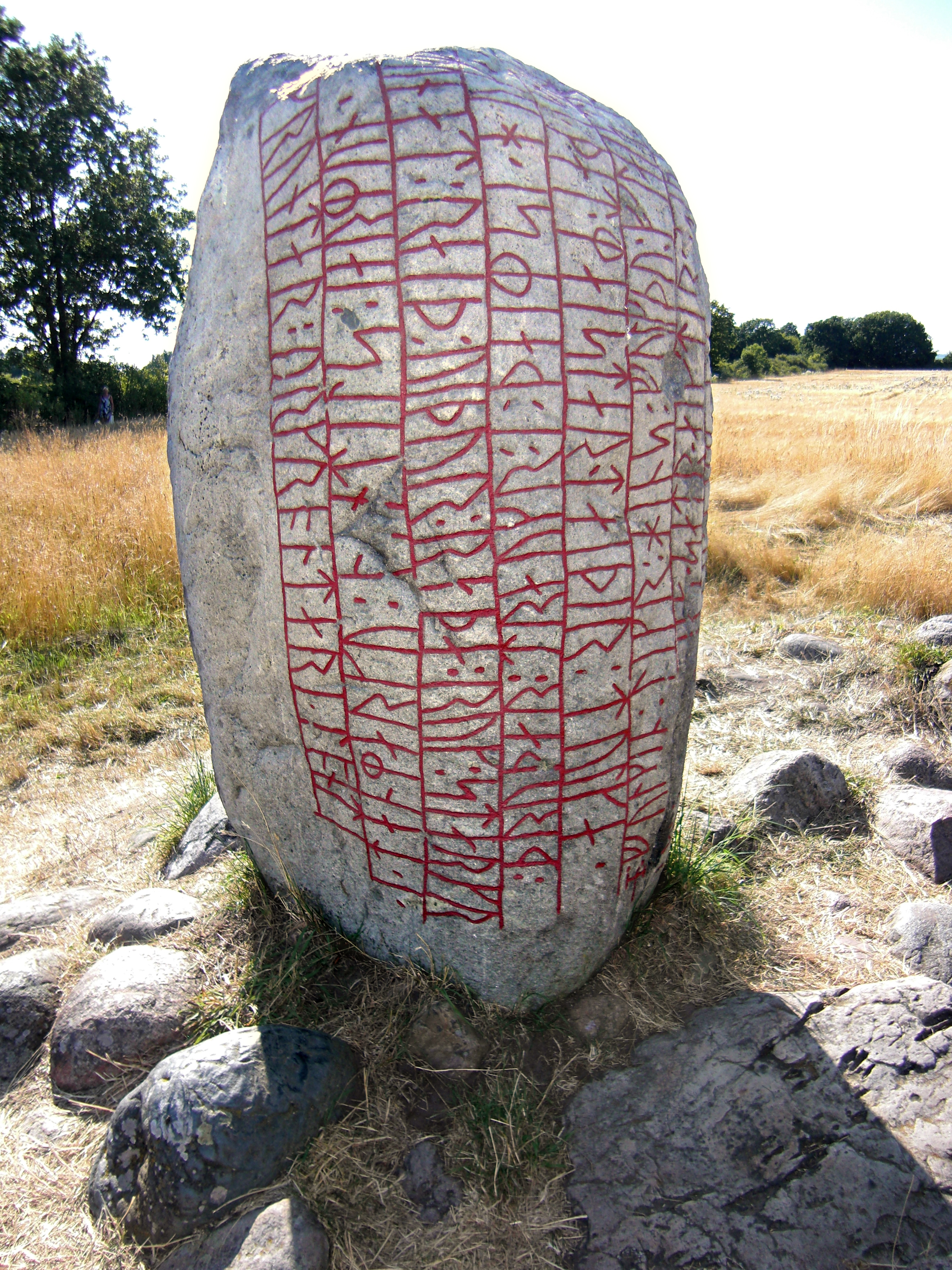

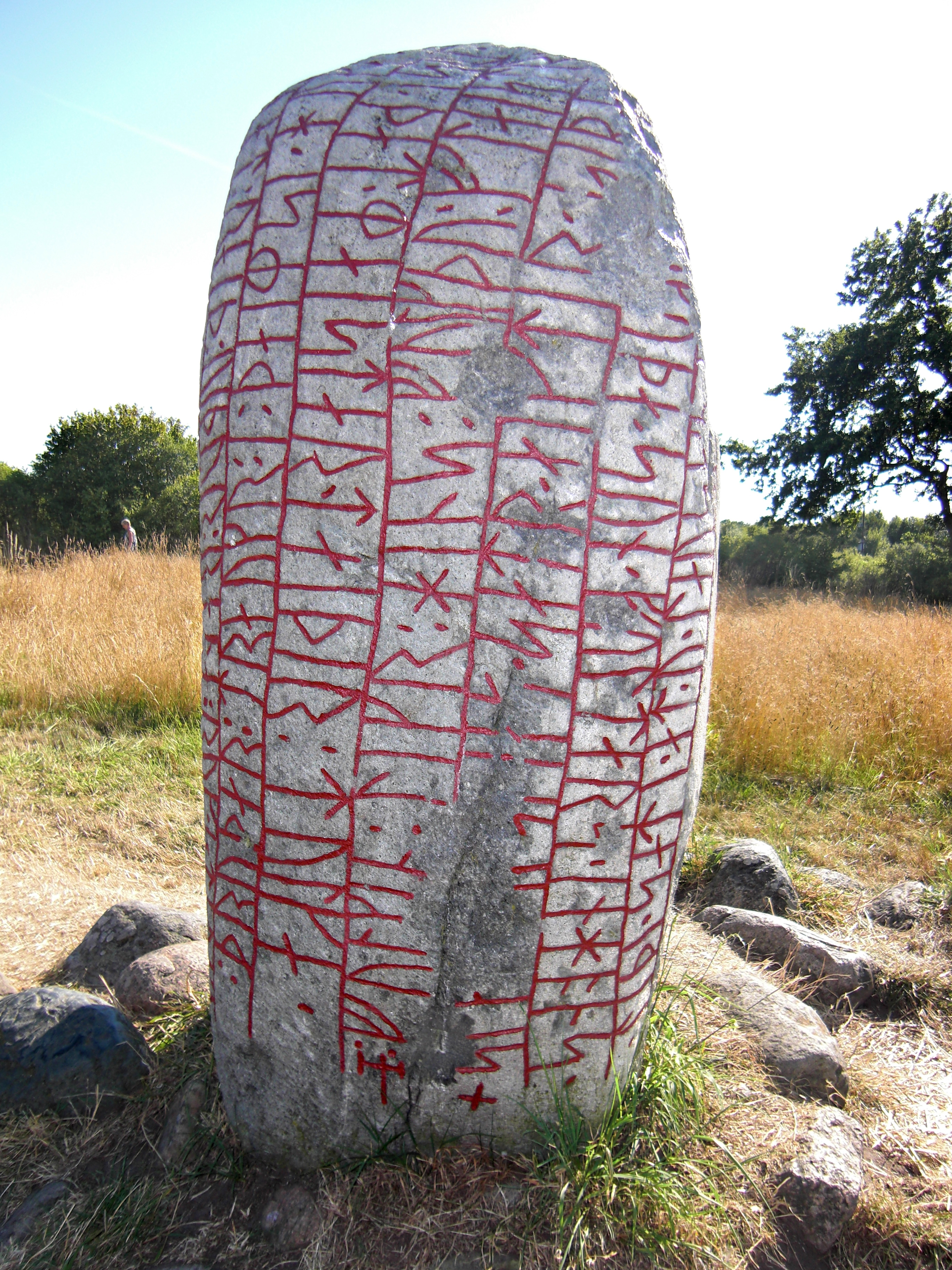

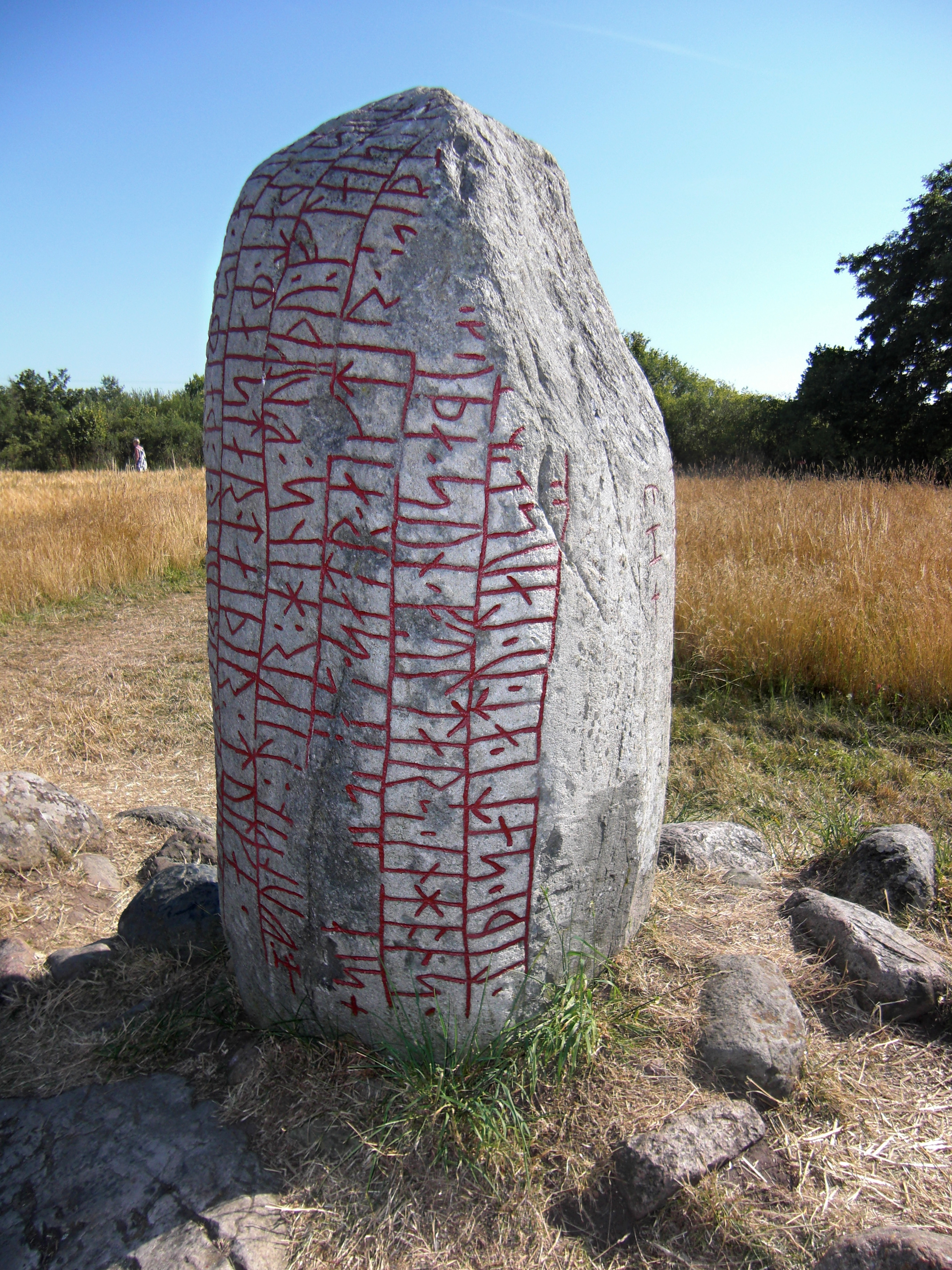

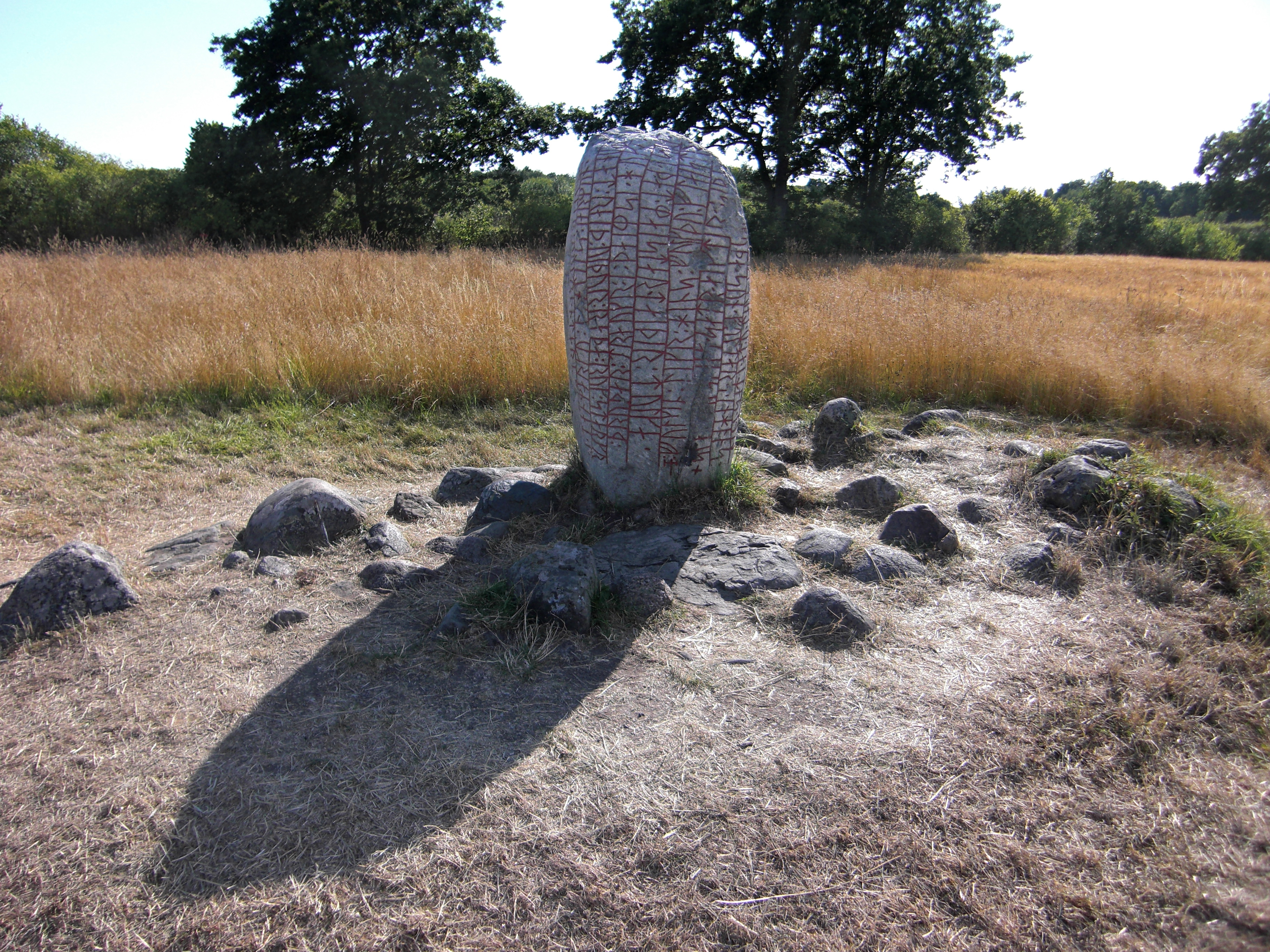

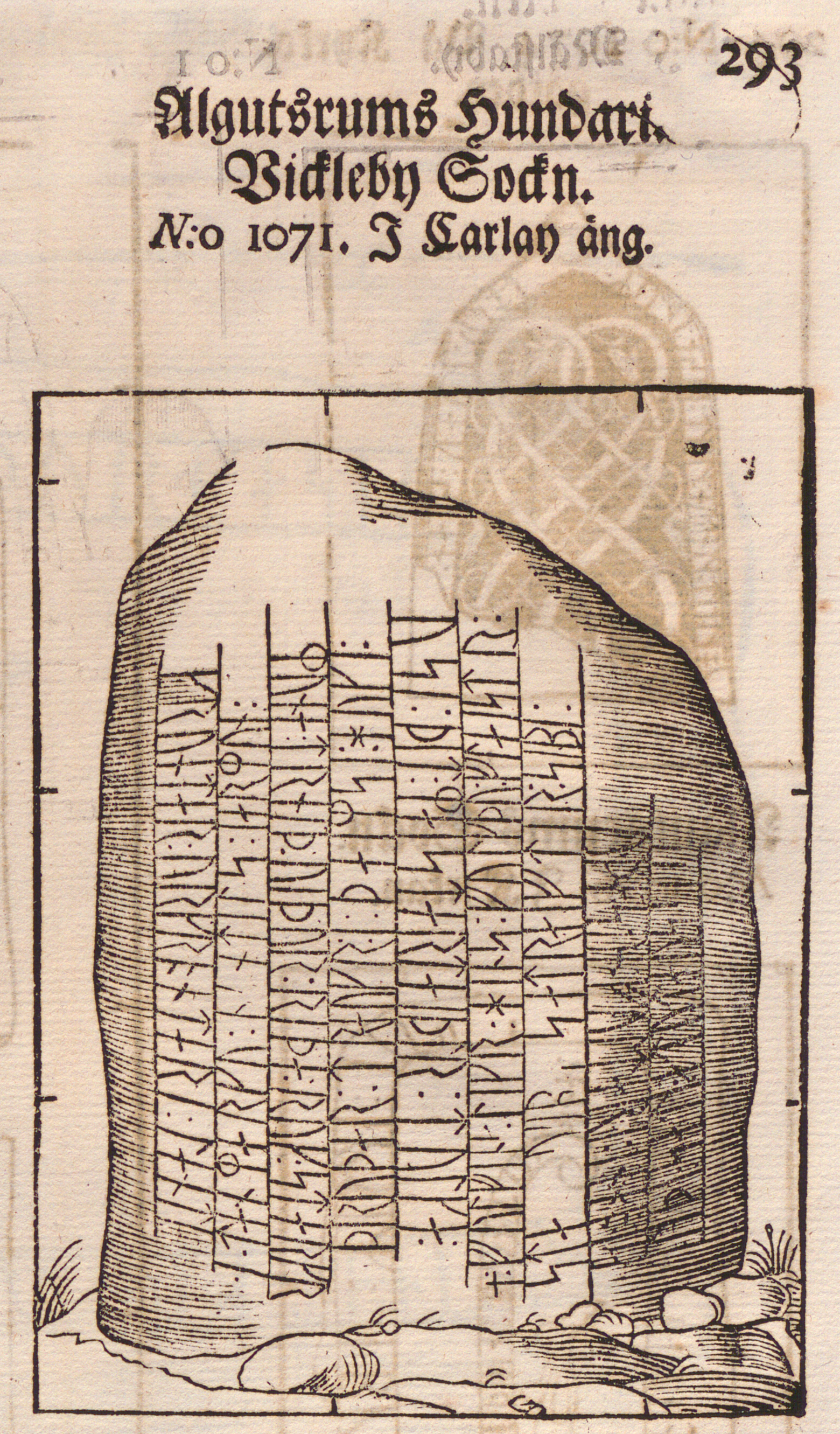
Depiction from 1750

== Bibliography ==
- Foote, Peter & Wilson, David M.: The Viking Achievement. 1989 ISBN 0-283-97926-7.
- Jansson Sven B. F.: Runinskrifter i Sverige. 1984. 201 pages.
- Salberger, Evert: "Dedikationen på Karlevi-Stenen, Mansnamn och Versform." Sydsvenska Ortnamnssällskapets Årsskrift 1997. pp. 88–115.
- Strid, Jan Paul: Runstenar. Malmö 1991. 119 pages.
- Söderberg, Sven: Sveriges Runinskrifter. Bd 1, "Ölands Runinskrifter." Stockholm 1900–1906.
