= Norra Härene Runestone =

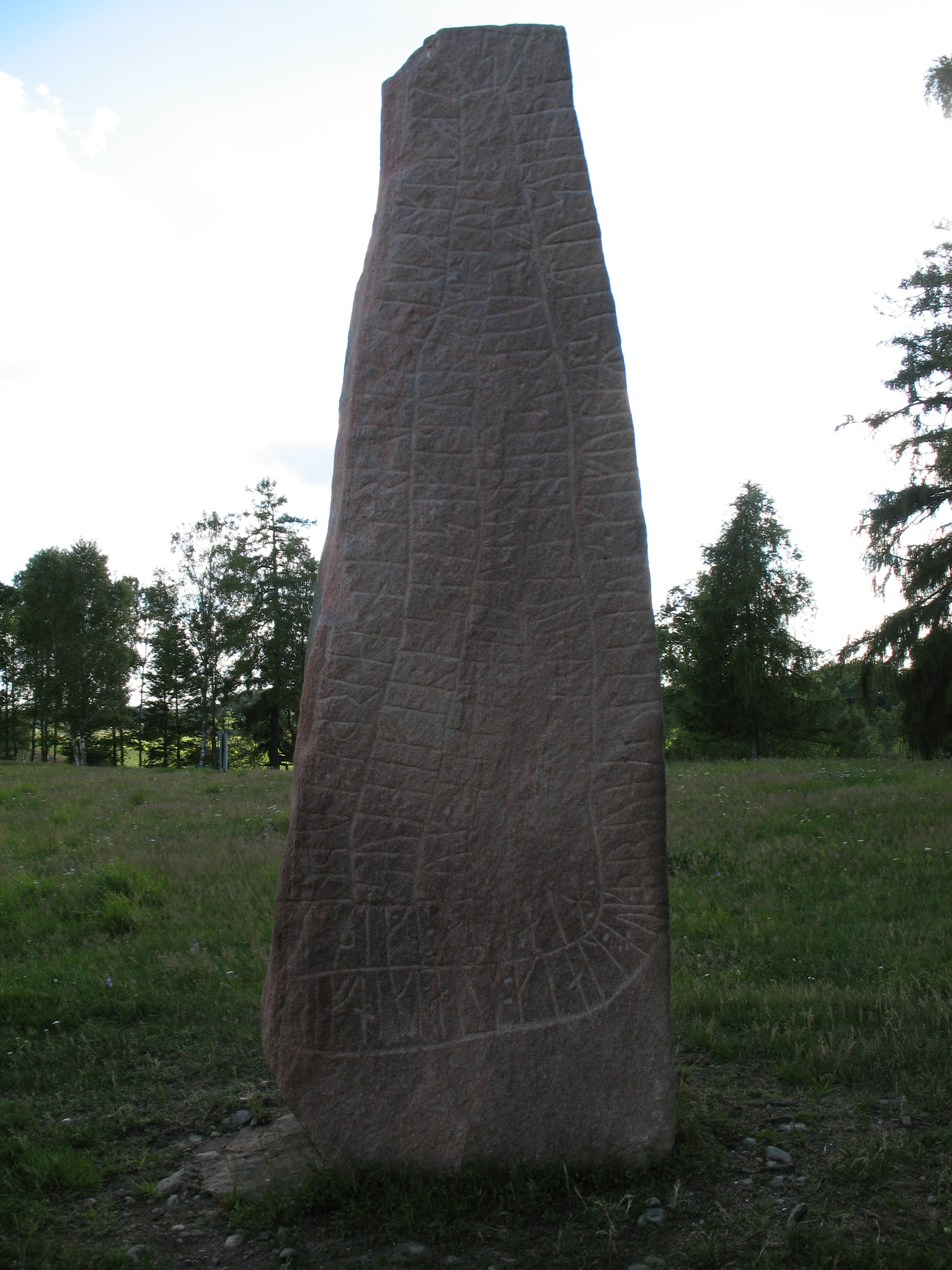
The Norra Härene stone at Dagsnäs Castle.

The Norra Härene Runestone, designated as Vg 59 by Rundata, is a Viking Age memorial runestone that is located on the grounds of Dagsnäs Castle, which is about seven kilometers south of Skara, Västra Götaland County, Sweden, in the historic province of Västergötland.

== Description ==
This runestone is a tall granite stone that stands at 3.3 metres tall and 1 metre wide. It was discovered in 1795 in the walls of the church of Norra Härene, which has been a ruin since the 17th century.

The runic text describes the deceased man Fótr as being "a very good thegn." The term thegn was used in the late Viking Age in Sweden and Denmark to describe a class of retainer. About fifty memorial runestones described the deceased as being a thegn. Of these, the runic text on other sixteen runestones uses the same Old Norse phrase harða goðan þegn, Vg 62 in Ballstorp, Vg 102 in Håle gamla, Vg 113 in Lärkegape, Vg 115 in Stora Västölet, Vg 151 in Eggvena, Vg NOR1997;27 in Hols, DR 86 in Langå, DR 106 in Ørum, DR 115 in Randers, DR 121 in Asferg, DR 123 in Glenstrup, DR 130 in Giver, DR 213 in Skovlænge, DR 278 in Västra Nöbbelöv, DR 294 in Baldringe, and DR 343 in Östra Herrestads. In addition, four inscriptions use a different word order, þegn harða goðan, include Vg 74 in Skolgården, Vg 152 in Håkansgården, Vg 157 in Storegården, and Vg 158 in Fänneslunda.

The text also states that the deceased man's wife Ása made something "as no other wife in memory of (her) husband will," but does not state what she made. One suggestion is that she composed a lament to mourn her husband. Another runestone where a widow is suggested as composing a lament is U 226 at Arkils tingstad.

== Inscription ==
rifnikʀ : auk : kiali : auk : brunulfʀ : auk : kifulfʀ : satu : stin : þonsi : iftiʀ : fut : faþur : sin : harþa : kuþon : þign : sua : hifiʀ : osa : as : igi : mun : sum : kuin : ift : uir : siþon : kaurua :: hialmʀ : auk : hiali : hiaku : runaʀ *
Hræfningʀ {} ok {} Gialli {} ok {} Brunulfʀ {} ok {} Gefulfʀ {} sattu {} stæin {} þannsi {} æftiʀ {} Fot, {} faður {} sinn, {} harða {} goðan {} þegn. {} Sva {} hæfiʀ {} Asa {} es {} æigi {} mun {} sum {} kvæn {} æft {} ver {} siðan {} gærva. {} Hialmʀ {} ok {} Hialli {} hioggu {} runaʀ. {}
Hrefningr and Gjalli and Brynjulfr and Gjafulfr placed this stone in memory of Fótr, their father, a very good thegn. Thus has Ása made, as no other wife in memory of (her) husband will. Hjalmr and Hjalli cut the runes.

== See also ==
- List of runestones
