= Bjärby Runestones =

Viking Age memorials in Sweden

The Bjärby Runestones are two Viking Age memorial runestones located near Grästorp, Sweden, in Bjärby synod, which was in the historic province of Västergötland. The two stones are memorials to men who held the titles thegn and drengr, and one has a depiction of the hammer of the Norse pagan deity Thor.

== Vg 113 ==
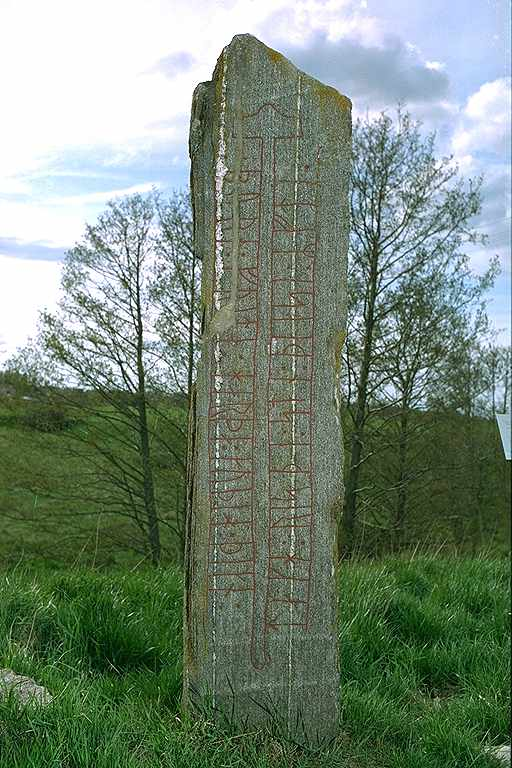
Vg113

Västergötland Runic Inscription 113 or Vg 113 is the Rundata listing for a runestone located in Lärkegapet, which is about one-half kilometer east of Grästorp (58.33524°N 12.69978°E). The inscription, which is on a gneiss stone that is 2.5 meters in height, consists of two vertical bands of runic text with the sides of the runic bands forming the handle of a hammer, which is considered to be a depiction of Thor's hammer Mjöllnir. Because of the length of the text bands, the hammer has a long shaft with the head located at the top of the stone. Thor's hammer was used on several memorial runestones in Sweden and Denmark, perhaps as a parallel to or a pagan reaction to the use of the cross by Christians. Other surviving runestones or inscriptions depicting Thor's hammer include runestones U 1161 in Altuna, Sö 86 in Åby, Sö 111 in Stenkvista, Öl 1 in Karlevi, DR 26 in Laeborg, DR 48 in Hanning, DR 120 in Spentrup, and DR 331 in Gårdstånga. The inscription is classified as being carved in runestone style RAK, which is the classification for inscriptions where the ends of the runic band do not have any attached serpent or beast heads.

The runic text states that the stone was raised as a memorial to his kinsman Bjôrn and describes the deceased man as being "a very good thegn." The term thegn was used in the late Viking Age in Sweden and Denmark to describe a class of retainer. About fifty memorial runestones described the deceased as being a thegn. Of these, the runic text on sixteen other runestones use the same Old Norse phrase harða goðan þegn, Vg 59 in Norra Härene, Vg 62 in Ballstorp, Vg 102 in Håle gamla, Vg 115 in Stora Västölet, Vg 151 in Eggvena, Vg NOR1997;27 in Hols, DR 86 in Langå, DR 106 in Ørum, DR 115 in Randers, DR 121 in Asferg, DR 123 in Glenstrup, DR 130 in Giver, DR 213 in Skovlænge, DR 278 in Västra Nöbbelöv, DR 294 in Baldringe, and DR 343 in Östra Herrestads. In addition, four inscriptions use a different word order, þegn harða goðan, include Vg 74 in Skolgården, Vg 152 in Håkansgården, Vg 157 in Storegården, and Vg 158 in Fänneslunda. The name of the sponsor, Dagr, which is an Old Norse word which means "day," also appears on Vg 101 in Bragnum and Ög 43 in Ingelstad, which uses an ideogram for the name, and is the personification of day in Norse mythology.

=== Inscription ===
takh : risþi : stn : þaisi : ʀfti : burn : frita : harþa : kuþih : þikn :
Dagʀ {} ræisti {} stæin {} þannsi {} æftiʀ {} Biorn {} frænda, {} harða {} goðan {} þegn. {}
Dagr raised this stone in memory of Bjôrn, (his) kinsman, a very good Þegn.

== Vg 114 ==
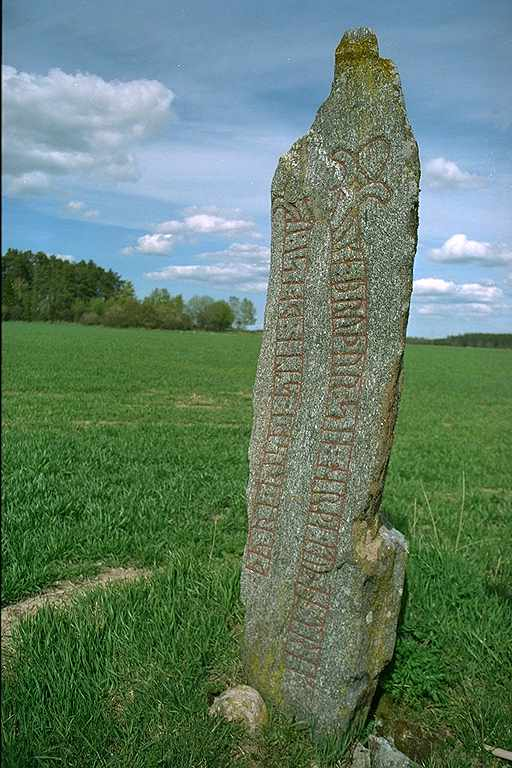
Vg114

Västergötland Runic Inscription 114 or Vg 114 is the Rundata listing for a runestone located in Börjesgården, which is about one-half kilometer northeast of Grästorp (58.34474°N 12.70570°E). The inscription, which is on a stone that is 2.5 meters in height and made of gneiss, consists of runic text within a single text band in the shape of a hook. The inscription, similar to Vg 113, is classified as being carved in runestone style RAK.

The runic text states that the stone is a memorial raised by Þórir in memory of his brother Tóki. The deceased man is described as being harða goðan dræng or "a very good valiant man," using the term drengr. A drengr in Denmark was a term mainly associated with members of a warrior group. It has been suggested that drengr along with thegn was first used as a title associated with men from Denmark and Sweden in service to Danish kings, but, from its context in inscriptions, over time became more generalized and was used by groups such as merchants or the crew of a ship. Other runestones describing the deceased using the words harþa goþan dræng in some order include DR 1 in Haddeby, DR 68 in Århus, DR 77 in Hjermind, DR 127 in Hobro, DR 268 in Östra Vemmenhög, DR 276 in Örsjö, DR 288 and DR 289 in Bjäresjö, Sm 48 in Torp, Vg 61 in Härlingstorp, Vg 90 in Torestorp, Vg 112 in Ås, the now-lost Vg 126 in Larvs, Vg 130 in Skånum, Vg 153 and Vg 154 in Fölene, Vg 157 in Storegården, Vg 162 in Bengtsgården, Vg 179 in Lillegården, Vg 181 in Frugården, Vg 184 in Smula (using a plural form), the now-lost Ög 60 in Järmstastenen, Ög 104 in Gillberga, and possibly on U 610 in Granhammar.

=== Inscription ===
* þuri : risþi : stin : þonsi : ift- : tuka : bruþur : sin : harþa : kuþan : trik :
{} Þoriʀ {} ræisti {} stæin {} þannsi {} æft[iʀ] {} Toka, {} broður {} sinn, {} harða {} goðan {} dræng. {}
Þórir raised this stone in memory of Tóki, his brother, a very good valiant man.
