= Danish Runic Inscription 120 =

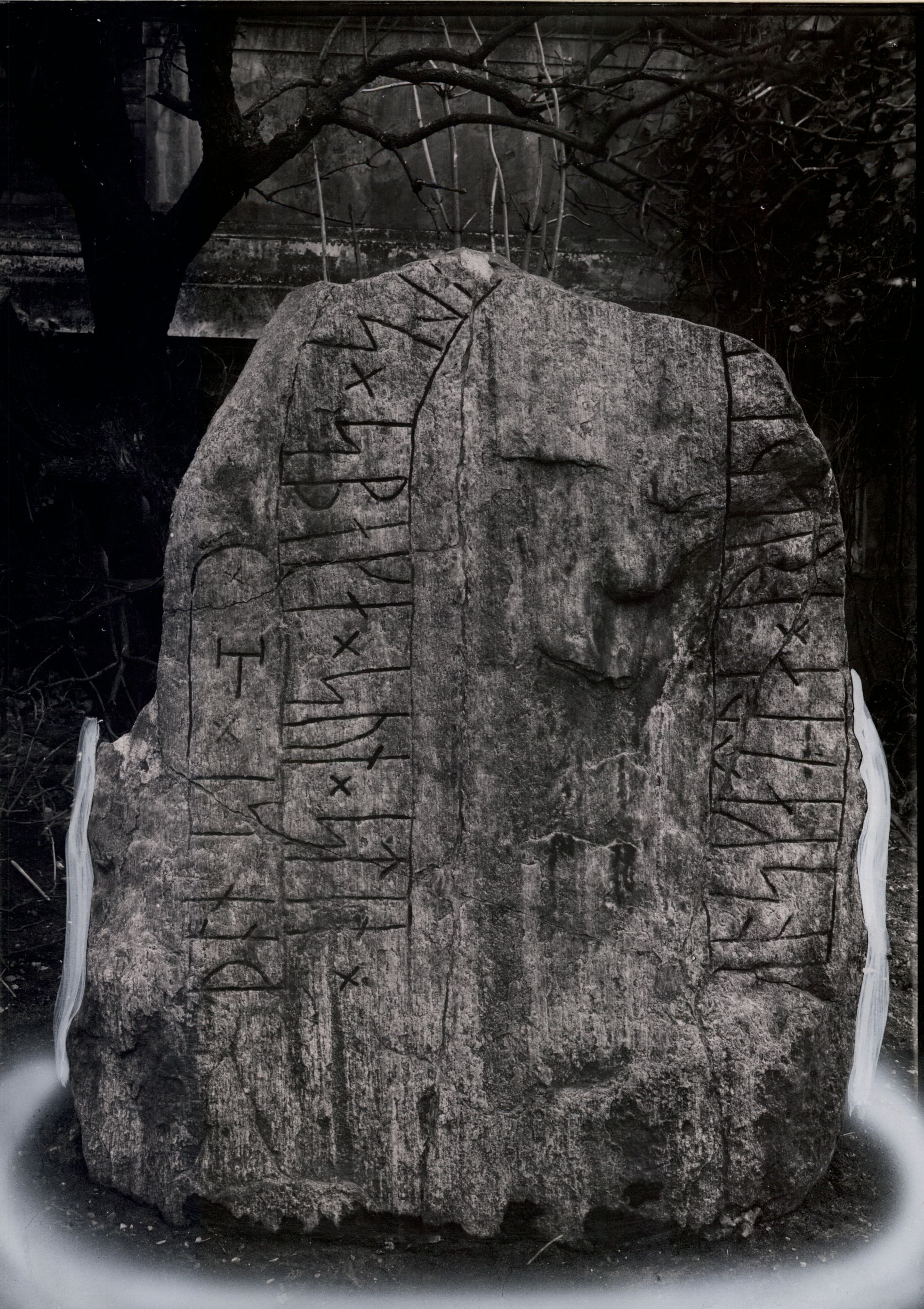
DR 120 in the mid-20th century, before its second breakage and restoration

Runestone DR 120, MJy 51, known as Spentrup stone 2 and the Jennum stone, is a Viking Age runestone engraved with the Younger Futhark and a Thor's hammer.

== Stone ==
The runestone was first mentioned by 18th-century scholar Søren Abildgaard, who wrote that it was found at the end of a stone bridge in the village of Jennum. It was lost for a long time until it was rediscovered in 1913, but by then it had been split into seven pieces. It was repaired and raised at the museum in the town of Randers. In the 1960s it was transferred to the new Museum Østjylland, during which it broke into 14 or 15 pieces; it has been restored.

The stone is granite, with a memorial inscription in the Younger Futhark in the RAK style, dated to 970-1020 or to 1000–1050. The top of the stone, including part of the inscription band, is missing.

The stone shows one of several pictorial representations of Thor's hammer, following the last punctuation mark (x) at the end of the inscription on the left; it resembles a cross or hammer on the front of the Karlevi Runestone, Öl 1. Other stones with Thor's hammer include DR 26, VG 113, Sö 86 and Sö 111.

== Inscription ==
oskatla × risþi (×) -… …-ls × sbaka × sun × stin × ¶ þonsi × ⁓
Askatla {} resþi {} … …[gi]sl, {} Spaka {} sun, {} sten {} {} þænsi. {} {}
Áskatla raised this stone … …-gísl, Spaki's son.

== Sources ==
- Sawyer, Birgit (2003). The Viking-Age Rune-Stones: Custom and Commemoration in Early Medieval Scandinavia. Oxford University Press. ISBN 0-19-820643-7.
