= Västra Strö 2 Runestone =

Coordinates: 55.8760°N 13.2430°E

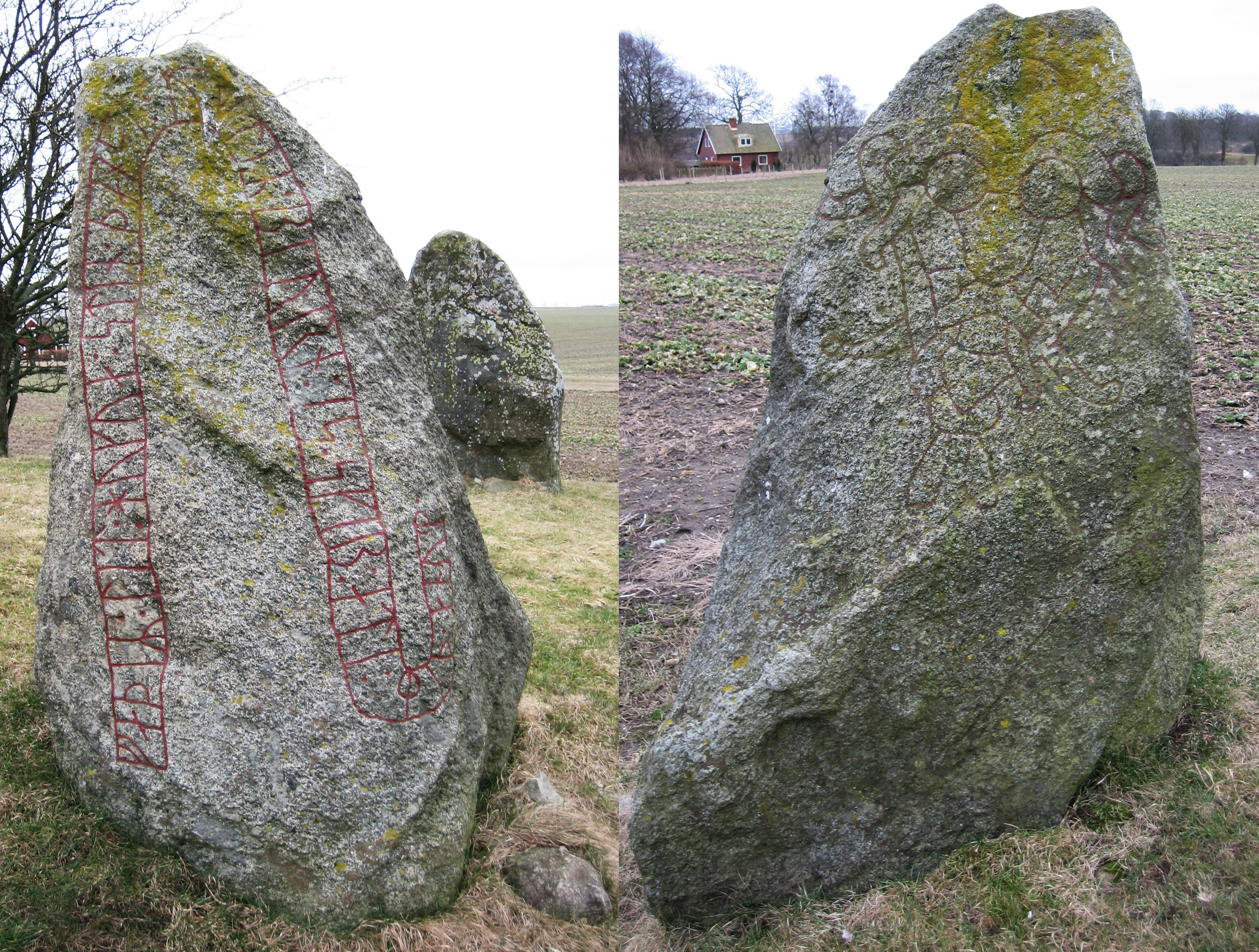
The two sides of the Västra Strö 2 Runestone.

The Västra Strö 2 Runestone, listed as DR 335 in the Rundata catalog, is a Viking Age memorial runestone located at the Västra Strö Monument, which is at a church that is about four kilometers northwest of Eslöv, Skåne County, Sweden.

== Description ==
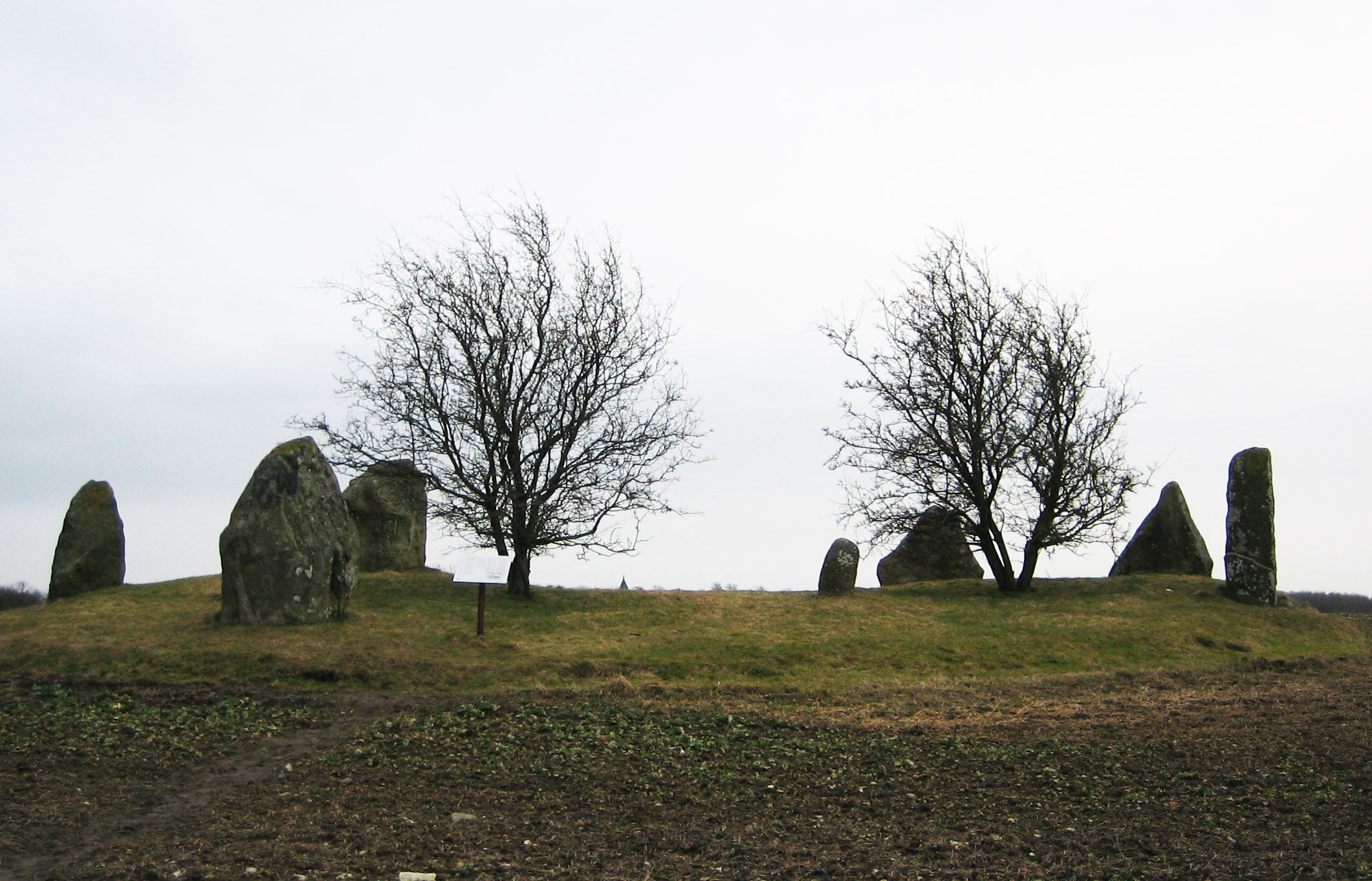
The Västra Strö Monument in 2009.

The Västra Strö Monument consists of five standing stones and two runestones, DR 355 and the Viking runestone DR 334. The two stones have a Danish Rundata catalog number because Scania was part of the historical Denmark during the Viking Age. The monument was surveyed in the 17th century by the Danish antiquarian Ole Worm who documented the inscriptions and reported that it was in good condition. This was not the case during a second survey in 1876 when all stones except one were found to have fallen. The Lund Kulturen restored the monument in 1932.

When the stone was raised in 1932, a mask of a man's face was discovered on the other side. This is a common motif and is found on several other runestones including DR 62 in Sjelle, DR 66 in Århus, DR 81 in Skern, DR 258 in Bösarp, the now-lost DR 286 in Hunnestad, DR 314 in Lund, Vg 106 in Lassegården, Sö 86 in Åby ägor, Sö 112 in Kolunda, Sö 167 in Landshammar, Sö 367 in Släbro, Nä 34 in Nasta, U 508 in Gillberga, U 670 in Rölunda, U 678 in Skokloster, U 824 in Holms, U 1034 in Tensta, and U 1150 in Björklinge, and on the Sjellebro Stone.

The Västra Strö 2 Runestone consists of runic text in an arch that is classified as being carved in runestone style RAK, which is considered to be the oldest classification. This is the classification for inscriptions that have straight text band ends without any attached serpent or beast heads. Each word in the runic text is separated by a two dot word divider punctuation mark. Runic inscriptions are often dated based upon comparative linguistic and stylistic analysis, and the inscription on DR 335 has been dated to approximately the period of 960 to 1050 C.E.

The runic text states that Faðir raised the stone as a memorial to Bjôrn, with whom he owned a ship, and Faðir likely created the Västra Strö Monument. Faðir also sponsored DR 344, which is a memorial to his brother Ôzurr, who died i wikingu or on a Viking raid or expedition. It is possible that Faðir and Bjôrn also went on this joint expedition. The brother Ôzurr is not mentioned as having a part owner the ship. Other runestones that state that the deceased was a ship owner include DR 68 in Århus and U 778 in Svinnegarn.

The stone is known locally as the Västra Ströstenen 2.

== Inscription ==
faþiʀ : lit : hukua : stin : þan(s)i : uftiʀ : biurn : is : skib : ati : miþ : anum :
Faðir {} lét {} hǫggva {} stein {} þenna {} eptir {} Bjǫrn, {} er {} skip {} átti {} með {} honum. {}
Faþiʀ {} let {} hoggwa {} sten {} þænsi {} æftiʀ {} Biorn, {} æs {} skip {} atti {} mæþ {} hanum. {}
Faðir had this stone cut in memory of Bjǫrn, who owned a ship with him.

== Other sources ==
- This article contains some information from the Swedish Wikipedia article Västra Strömonumentet.

== Gallery ==
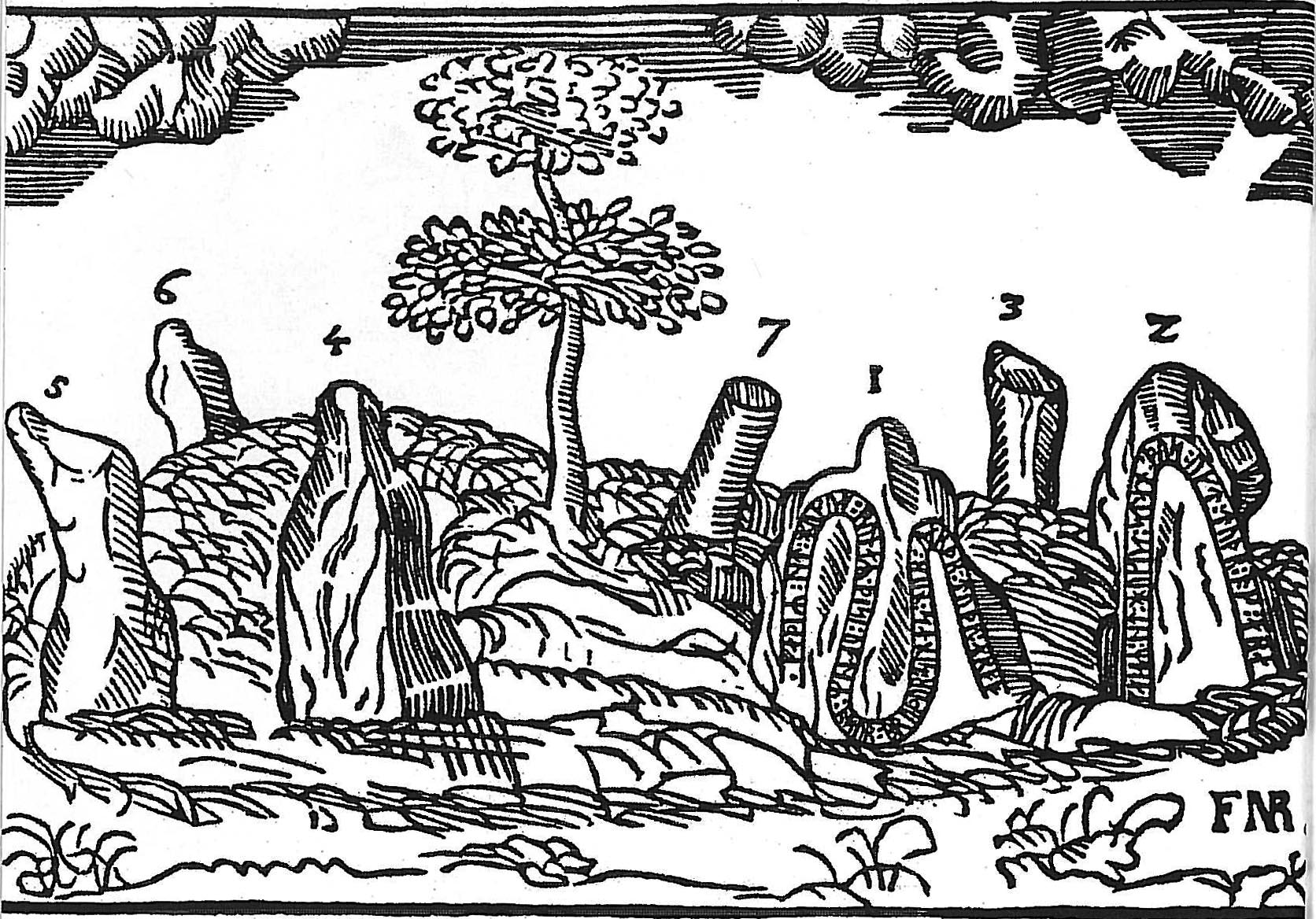
Drawing of the Västra Strö Monument published by Old Worm in 1643

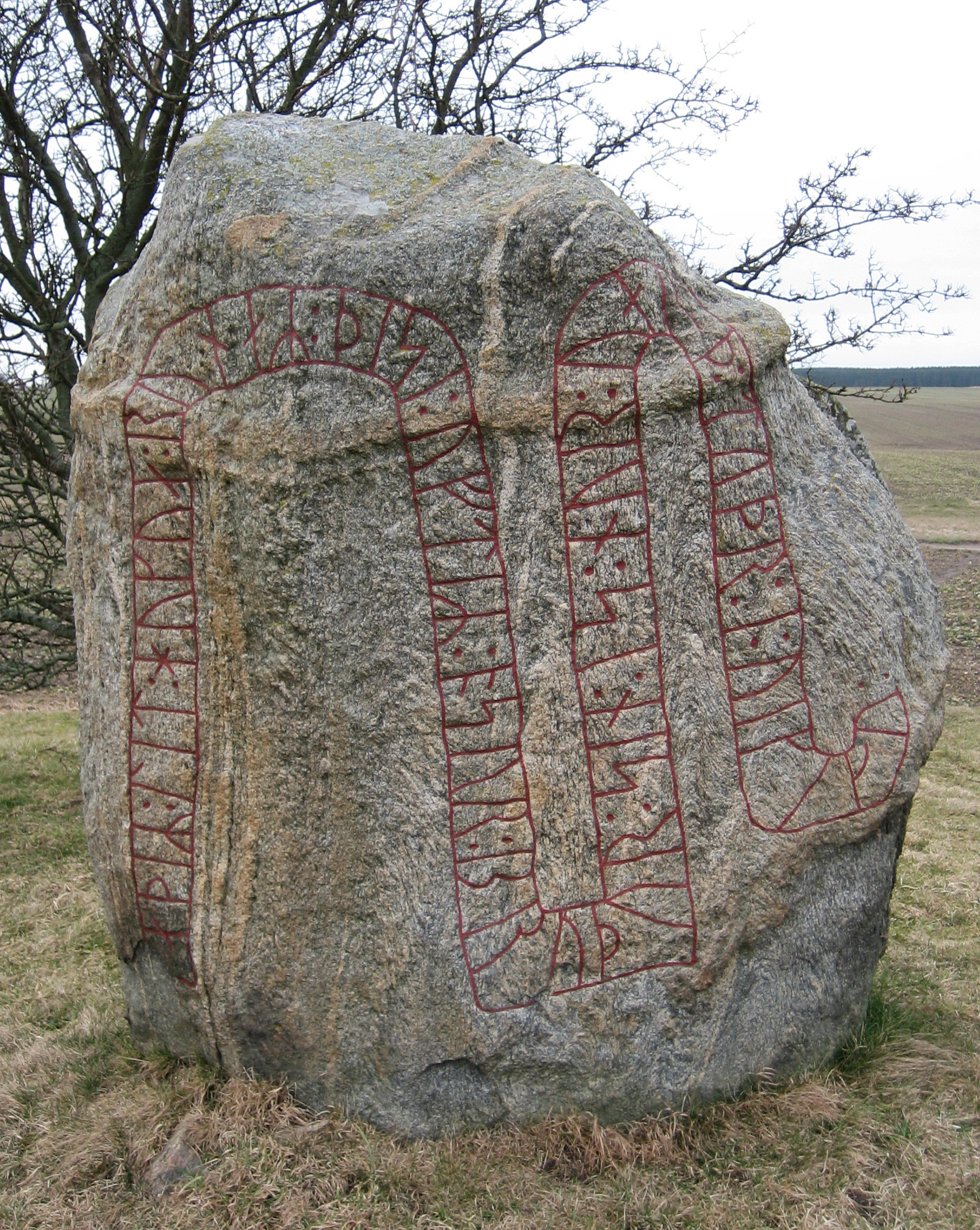
The inscription on DR 334 states "Faðir had these runes cut in memory of Ôzurr, his brother, who died in the north on a viking raid."
