= Danish Runic Inscription 66 =

Viking Age runestone

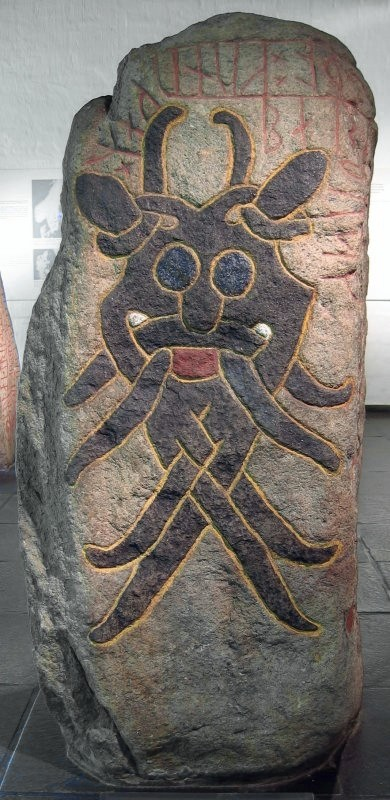
- Created: c. 1000
- Discovered: Aarhus, Jutland, Denmark
- Rundata ID: DR 66
- Runemaster: unknown

Text – Native
- Old Norse : See article.

Translation
- See article.

Danish Runic Inscription 66 or DR 66, also known as the Mask stone, is a granite Viking Age memorial runestone that was discovered in Aarhus, Denmark. The inscription features a facial mask and memorializes a man who died in a battle.

== Description ==
The runestone is famous for bearing a depiction of a facial mask and an Old Norse runic inscription mentioning a battle between kings, which also appears on Västergötland Runic Inscription 40. There is insufficient evidence to establish which battle the inscription refers to, but the Battle of Svolder (c.1000) and the Battle of Helgeån (1026) have been proposed as candidates. The mask depicted has been explained by the Moesgård Museum as "probably intended to be protection against evil spirits". Other inscriptions using a facial mask, which was a common motif, include DR 62 in Sjelle, DR 81 in Skern, DR 258 in Bösarp, the now-lost DR 286 in Hunnestad, DR 314 in Lund, DR 335 in Västra Strö, Vg 106 in Lassegården, Sö 86 in Åby ägor, Sö 112 in Kolunda, Sö 167 in Landshammar, Sö 367 in Släbro, Nä 34 in Nasta, U 508 in Gillberga, U 670 in Rölunda, U 678 in Skokloster, U 824 in Holms, U 1034 in Tensta, and U 1150 in Björklinge, and on the Sjellebro Stone.

The stone may have originally been located along the important road into Aarhus from the west, as it was found with most of the other runestones in Aarhus in buildings adjoining this important road. In the Mask Stone's case, it was discovered beneath Aarhus Mill in 1850, where the city park Mølleparken ("The Mill Park") now exists. The stone is currently on exhibition at the Moesgård Museum, the logo of which was inspired by the stone's mask.

The runic text indicates that the stone was raised by four men as a memorial to a man named Fúl. The relationship between the men is described as a félag, which was a joint financial venture between partners during the Viking Age. Other runestones that use a form of the term félag include Sö 292 in Bröta, Vg 112 in Ås, Vg 122 in Abrahamstorp, the now-lost Vg 146 in Slöta, Vg 182 in Skattegården, U 391 in Villa Karlsro, the now-lost U 954 in Söderby, DR 1 in Haddeby, DR 68 in Århus, DR 125 in Dalbyover, DR 127 in Hobro, DR 262 in Fosie, DR 270 in Skivarp, DR 279 in Sjörup, DR 316 in Norra Nöbbelöv, DR 318 in Håstad, DR 321 in Västra Karaby, DR 329 and DR 330 in Gårdstånga, DR 339 in Stora Köpinge, and X UaFv1914;47 in Berezanj, Ukraina.

== Inscription ==
⁑ kunulfʀ ⁑ auk ⁑ augutr ⁑ auk ⁑ aslakʀ ⁑ auk ⁑ rulfʀ ⁑ risþu
{} Gunnulfr {} ok {} Eygautr/Auðgautr {} ok {} Áslakr {} ok {} Hrólfr {} reistu
{} Gunulfʀ {} ok {} Øgotr/Øþgotr {} ok {} Aslakʀ {} ok {} Rolfʀ {} resþu
Gunnulfr and Eygautr/Auðgautr and Áslakr and Hrólfr raised

⁑ stin ⁑ þansi ⁑ eftiʀ × ful ⁑ fela(k)a ⁑ sin {⁑ ¶ ⁑} iaʀ ⁑ uarþ (⁑) …y-- × tuþr ⁑
{} stein {} þenna {} eptir {} Fúl/Full/Fyl, {} félaga {} sinn, {} er {} varð {} … {} dauðr, {}
{} sten {} þænsi {} æftiʀ {} Ful/Full/Fyl, {} felaga {} sin, {} æʀ {} warþ {} … {} døþr, {}
this stone in memory of Fúll/Fullr/Fylr, their partner, who died

þo ⁑ kunukaʀ {× ¶} barþusk ⁑
þá {} konungar {} bǫrðusk. {}
þa {} kunungaʀ {} barþusk. {}
when kings fought.
