= Södermanland Runic Inscription 367 =

Cultural monument in Sweden

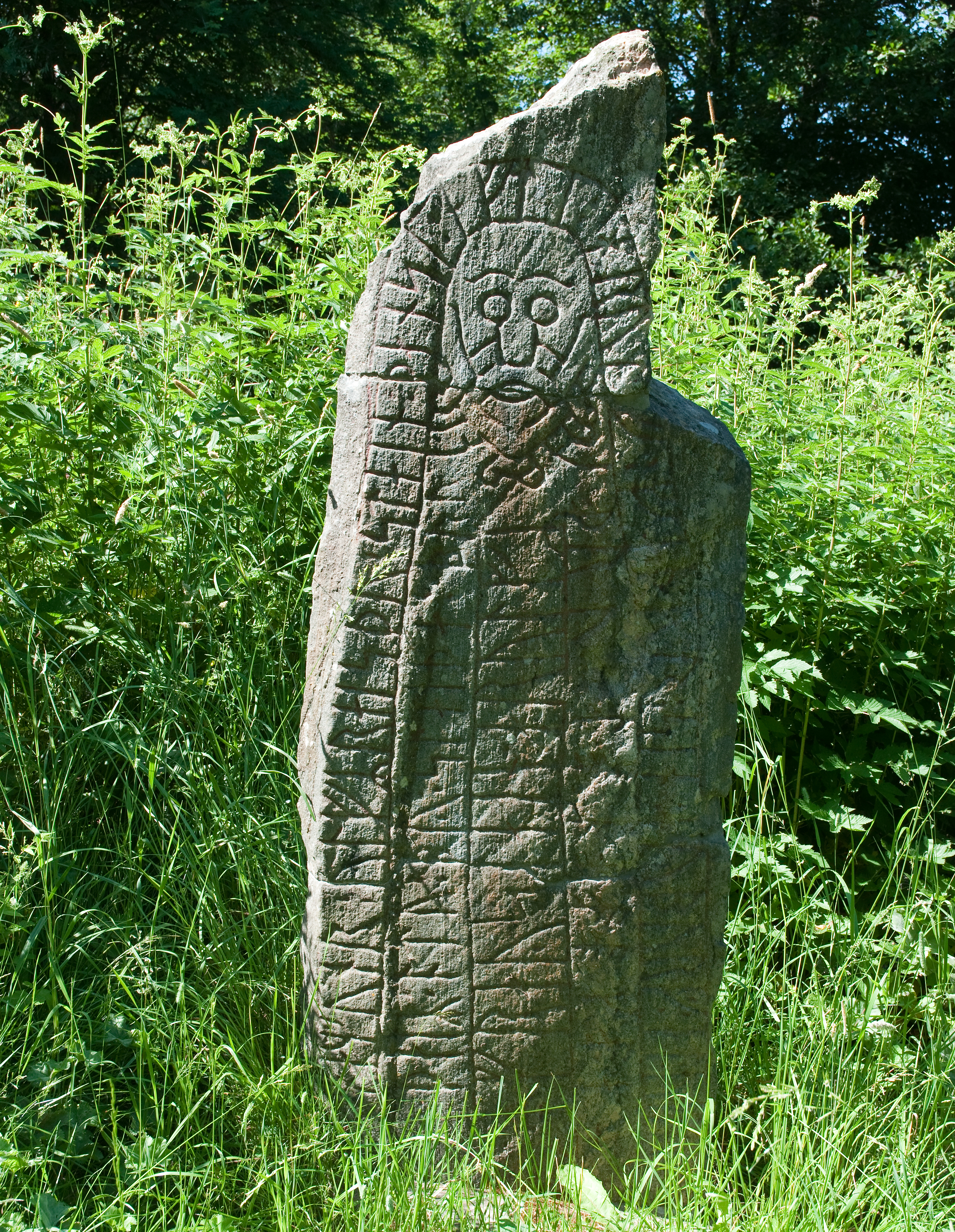
Sö 367 is located in Släbro.

Södermanland Runic Inscription 367 or Sö 367 is the Rundata catalog designation for a Viking Age memorial runestone located in Släbro, which is one kilometer north of Nyköping, Södermanland County, Sweden, which was in the historic province of Södermanland. The inscription has a facial mask and describes two men as being thegns and the owners of Sleðabrú, which today is modern day Släbro.

== Description ==
This inscription consists of runic text in the younger futhark in three rows and in an arch around a facial mask. The runestone, which is made of gneiss and is 1.78 meters in height, is classified as being carved in runestone style RAK, which is considered to be the oldest classification. This is the classification for inscriptions that have straight text band ends without any attached serpent or beast heads. The facial mask on this stone is a common motif and is found on several other runestones including DR 62 in Sjellebro, DR 66 in Århus, DR 81 in Skern, DR 258 in Bösarp, the now-lost DR 286 in Hunnestad, DR 314 in Lund, DR 335 in Västra Strö, Vg 106 in Lassegården, Sö 86 in Åby ägor, Sö 112 in Kolunda, Sö 167 in Landshammar, Nä 34 in Nasta, U 508 in Gillberga, U 670 in Rölunda, U 678 in Skokloster, U 824 in Holms, U 1034 in Tensta, and U 1150 in Björklinge, and on the Sjellebro Stone. A small cross is at the bottom of the center line of text, and it has been suggested that the facial mask represents Jesus Christ. Sö 367 was discovered broken in three pieces in a bathing area of the Nyköpingsån river near a farm in 1935, although it may have been noted in an earlier runestone survey conducted in the 1600s. This location was at an old crossing of this river, which was an important Viking Age waterway in Södermanland.

The inscription on Sö 367 states that Hámundr and Ulfr raised the stone as a memorial to their father Hrólfr and were assisted by Hrólfr's spouse Eybjôrg. The text states that the father Hrólfr and a man named Freysteinn were Þegns or thegns. The exact status of thegns in Scandinavia is unclear, although the term was borrowed from England, where it was used for royal or military retainers. Scandinavian thegns appear to have been powerful local landowners but it is unclear whether their status reflected royal sponsorship or power. The Old Norse phrase þrottaʀ þiagnaʀ or "þegns of strength" is written in a coded form using a combination of runes and cipher runes. In addition, the word þrottaʀ uses a reverse-read bind rune that combines a þ-rune and an o-rune, although it has been suggested that this was due to an error in carving the runes. The phrase "Þegns of strength" is also used on Sö Fv1948;295 in Prästgården and in its singular form on Sö 90 in Lövhulta, Sö 112 in Kolunda, Sö 151 in Lövsund, Sö 158 in Österberga, and Sö 170 in Nälberga. The text also uses a dotted form of the m-rune, which is considered to be a transitional form. The only other runestone in Södermanland that uses this form of an m-rune is Sö Fv1986;218, although it is used on some other runestones in southern Sweden and Denmark.

Hrólfr and Freysteinn are also stated as being the owners of Sleðabrú, which today is Släbro. The name Sleðabrú when the runestone was discovered was described as coming from Slaiþa|Bru meaning "bridge for sleighs." However, it has been suggested that the first part of the name comes from the stem slaiðo which means "slowly gliding," and refers to the Nyköpingsån river.

Sö 367 is known locally as the Släbrostenen. A second runestone, Sö 45, has been placed just south of Sö 367.

== Inscription ==
=== Transliteration of the runes into Latin characters ===
hamunr : ulfʀ raisþu : stain : þinsi : efti : hrulf : faþur : sin : ayburg : at : unir sin þaiʀ otu : by : slaiþa:bru + fraystain : hrulfʀ o=þrutoʀ þiakna

=== Transcription into Old Norse ===
Hamundr, Ulfʀ ræisþu stæin þennsi æftiʀ Hrolf, faður sinn, Øyborg at ver sinn. Þæiʀ attu by Sleðabro, Frøystæinn, Hrolfʀ, þrottaʀ þiagnaʀ.

=== Translation in English ===
Hámundr (and) Ulfr raised this stone in memory of Hrólfr, their father; Eybjôrg in memory of her husband. Freysteinn (and) Hrólfr, þegns of strength, they owned the estate of Sleðabrú.
