= Uppland Runic Inscription 824 =

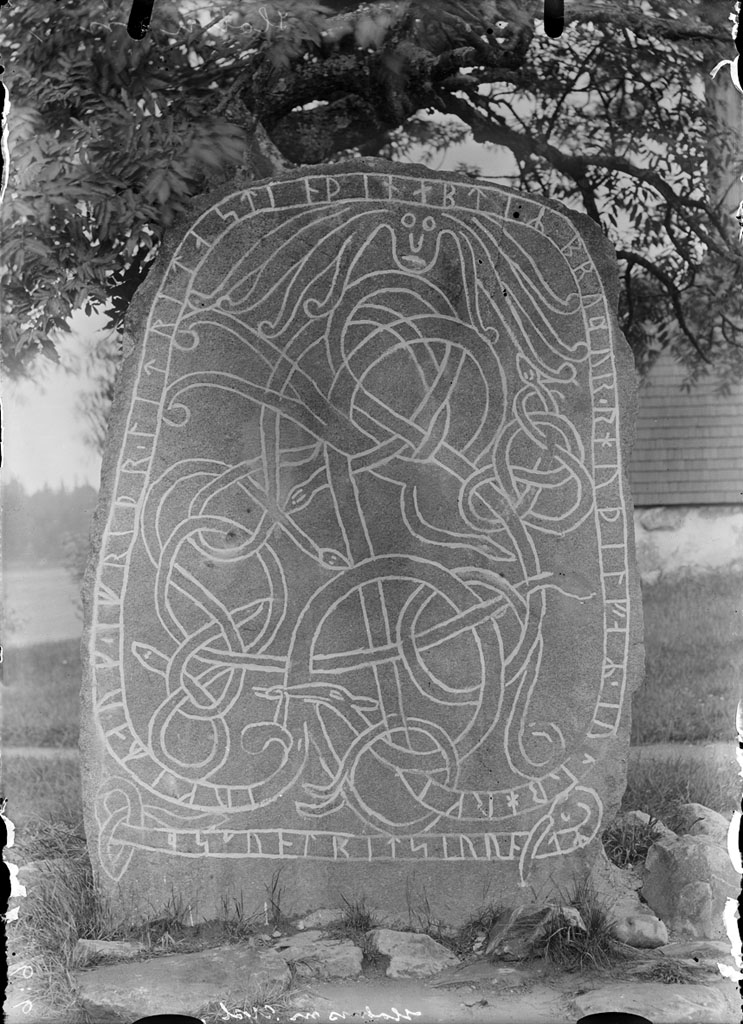
U 824 as it looked around 1900.

Uppland Runic Inscription 824 is the Rundata catalog number for a Viking Age memorial runestone located at Holms, which is about eight kilometers east of Örsundsbro, Uppsala County, Sweden, and in the historic province of Uppland. The inscription features a facial mask and a bind rune in the text.

== Description ==
This inscription consists of runic text carved on a serpent that is intertwined with and encircles other serpents. The inscription is classified as being carved in either runestone style Pr3 or Pr4, both of which are considered to be Urnes style. This runestone style is characterized by slim and stylized animals that are interwoven into tight patterns. The animal heads are typically seen in profile with slender almond-shaped eyes and upwardly curled appendages on the noses and the necks. At the top of the inscription but within the outer serpent is a mask of a man's face. This is a common motif and is found on several other runestones including DR 62 in Sjelle, DR 66 in Århus, DR 81 in Skern, DR 258 in Bösarp, the now-lost DR 286 in Hunnestad, DR 314 in Lund, DR 335 in Västra Strö, Vg 106 in Lassegården, Sö 86 in Åby ägor, Sö 112 in Kolunda, Sö 167 in Landshammar, Sö 367 in Släbro, Nä 34 in Nasta, U 508 in Gillberga, U 670 in Rölunda, U 678 in Skokloster, U 1034 in Tensta, and U 1150 in Björklinge, and on the Sjellebro Stone.

The runic text on this stone, which is 2.2 meters in height, is in the younger futhark. Although damaged, it states that it was raised by two brothers named Jógeirr and Áfríðr as a memorial to Hróðelfr. The text is signed by the runemaster Åsmund Kåresson on a separate band at the bottom of the inscription. Åsmund was active in the first half of the 11th century. He is associated with the Urnes style and signed about twenty of the surviving runestones. Other surviving runestones that are signed by Åsmund include U 301 in Skånela, the now-lost U 346 in Frösunda, U 356 in Ängby, the now-lost U 368 in Helgåby, U 847 in Västeråker, U 859 in Måsta, U 871 in Ölsta, U 884 in Ingla, U 932 at Uppsala Cathedral, U 956 in Vedyxa, U 969 in Bolsta, the now-lost U 986 in Kungsgården, U 998 in Skällerö, U 1142 in Åbyggeby, U 1144 in Tierp, U 1149 in Fleräng, U Fv1986;84 in Bo gård, U Fv1988;241 in Rosersberg, Gs 11 in Järvsta, Gs 12 in Lund, and Gs 13 in Söderby.

The text contains a bind rune that combines the final u-rune of the word litu with the initial r-rune of the word rita, but it has been suggested that this was done possibly as a result of an error in carving the runes. The text in two locations follows the rule that two consecutive identical letters are represented by a single rune, even when the two identical letters are at the end of one word and the start of a second word. When the text shown as Latin characters, the transliterated runes are doubled and separate words are shown. This inscription uses one a-rune in the runes þinabtiʀ, which is transliterated as the words þina| |abtiʀ, and in the runemaster's signature, osmuntritsi, an additional r-rune is added in the transliteration to form the words osmuntr| |ritsi ("Ásmundr carved"). Åsmund signed his name in this same manner on two other inscriptions, U 1142 and U 1144.

== Inscription ==
=== Transliteration of the runes into Latin characters ===
iukiʀ auk * ifriþr * litu= =rita stian þina| |abtiʀ bruþur * rhuþilfaʀ * i u-(r)bhrki osmuntr| |ritsi runaʀ

=== Transcription into Old Norse ===
Iogæiʀʀ ok Afriðr(?) letu retta stæin þenna æftiʀ broður Hroðælfaʀ i < u-r>bergi. Asmundr risti runaʀ.

=== Translation in English ===
Jógeirr and Áfríðr(?) had this stone erected in memory of Hróðelfr of ... -bergi's brother. Ásmundr carved the runes.

== See also ==
- List of runestones
