= Uppland Runic Inscription 1034 =

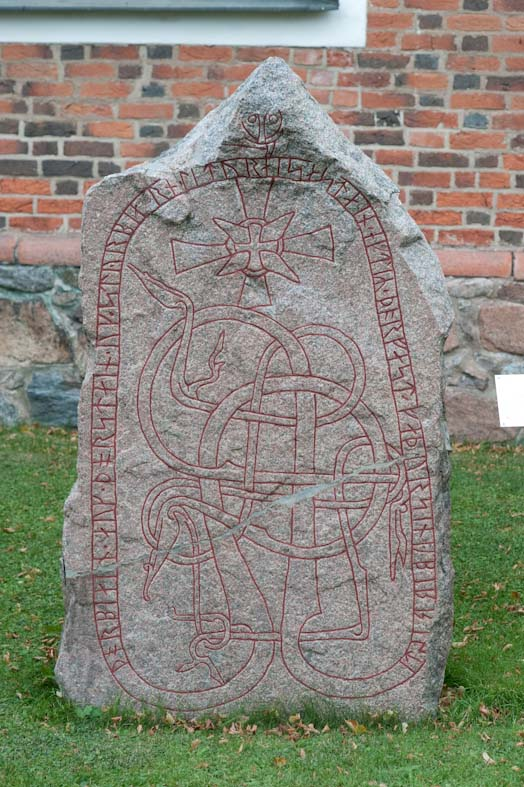
U 1034

Uppland Runic Inscription 1034 or U 1034 is the Rundata catalog number for a runic inscription on a runestone located at the Tensta Church, which is three kilometers northwest of Vattholma, Uppsala County, Sweden, and in the historic province of Uppland, that was carved in the late 11th or early 12th century. While the tradition of carving inscriptions into boulders began in the 4th century and lasted into the 12th century, most runestones date from the late Viking Age.

== Description ==
The runic inscription states that it was Øpiʀ risti ("Öpir carved"), indicating that it was carved by the runemaster Öpir, who was active in the late 11th or early 12th century. The inscription is carved in runestone style Pr5, also known as the Urnes style. This runestone style is characterized by slim and stylized animals that are interwoven into tight patterns. The animal heads are typically seen in profile with slender almond-shaped eyes and upwardly curled appendages on the noses and the necks. The runestone shows a cross with the inscription within a serpent around the edge. Although damaged at the top, the runestone formerly had a man's mask above the Christian cross, a motif used on some other runestones such as Sö 86 in Åby ägor, Sö 112 in Kolunda, Sö 367 in Landshammar, Na 34 in Nasta, and U 678 in Skokloster. Other inscriptions with masks but without crosses include DR 62 in Sjelle, DR 66 in Århus, DR 81 in Skern, DR 258 in Bösarp, the now-lost DR 286 in Hunnestad, DR 314 in Lund, DR 335 in Västra Strö, Vg 106 in Lassegården, Sö 367 in Släbro, U 508 in Gillberga, U 670 in Rölunda, U 824 in Holms, and U 1150 in Björklinge, and on the Sjellebro Stone.

Although the runestone is marked with a Christian cross, three of the personal names mentioned in the inscription contain the Norse pagan god Thor as a name element. The name Þorbjôrn translates as "Thor Bear," Þorsteinn as "Thor's Stone," and Þorfastr as "Thor Fast" (fast in the sense of holding one's ground in battle). These three names in the inscription also reflect a common practice of that time in Scandinavia of repeating an element in a parent's name in the names of children. Here the Þor from the father's name, Þorfastr, is repeated in the names of two of his sons, Þorbjôrn and Þorsteinn, to show the family relationship. The name of the third son, Styrbjôrn, means "Battle Bear."

== Inscription ==
=== Transliteration of the runes into Latin characters ===
þorbia(r)n ' auk ' þorstain ' uk ' styrbiarn ' litu raisa stain ' eftiʀ ' þorfast ' faþur sin ybir risti

=== Transcription into Old Norse ===
Þorbjôrn ok Þorsteinn ok Styrbjôrn létu reisa stein eptir Þorfast, fôður sinn. Œpir risti.

=== Translation in English ===
Þorbjôrn and Þorsteinn and Styrbjôrn had the stone raised in memory of Þorfastr, their father. Œpir carved.

== See also ==
- List of runestones
