= Södermanland Runic Inscription 86 =

Coordinates: 59.2887°N 16.1076°E

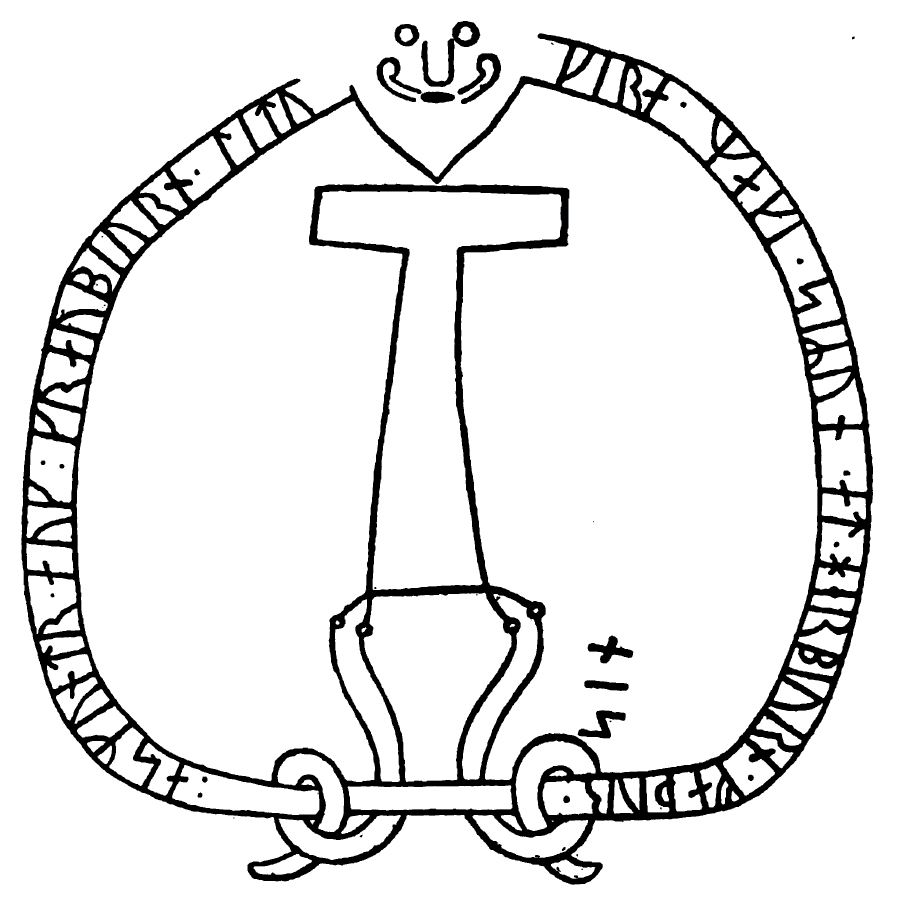
A drawing of runic inscription Sö 86 published in 1876.

Sö 86 is the Rundata catalog number for a Viking Age memorial runic inscription located in Åby, which is about one kilometer north of Ålberga, Södermanland County, Sweden, and in the historic province of Södermanland. The inscription features a depiction of the hammer of the Norse pagan god Thor named Mjöllnir and a facial mask.

== Description ==
This inscription has runic text in the younger futhark within a band that circles an image of Thor's hammer which is supported by two serpents. The inscription is carved on an outcropping of granite and the image is approximately 1.8 meters in height. Above the hammer is a facial mask of a man with a moustache and beard. The face represented by the mask is typically interpreted as being that of Thor due to its proximity to the hammer, although there are some who have suggested that the image represents the face of Christ above a cross. A mask was a motif common on inscriptions and is found on several other surviving runestones in Scandinavia including DR 62 in Sjelle, DR 66 in Århus, DR 81 in Skern, DR 258 in Bösarp, the now-lost DR 286 in Hunnestad, DR 314 in Lund, DR 335 in Västra Strö, Vg 106 in Lassegården, Sö 112 in Kolunda, Sö 167 in Landshammar, Sö 367 in Släbro, Nä 34 in Nasta, U 508 in Gillberga, U 670 in Rölunda, U 678 in Skokloster, U 824 in Holms, U 1034 in Tensta, and U 1150 in Björklinge, and on the Sjellebro Stone. The Sö 86 inscription is numbered among several in Scandinavia that have a dedication to Thor. The image of Thor's hammer was used on several other memorial runestones in Sweden and Denmark, perhaps as a parallel to or a pagan reaction to the use of the cross by Christians. Other surviving runestones depicting Thor's hammer include runestones U 1161 in Altuna, Sö 111 in Stenkvista, Vg 113 in Lärkegapet, Öl 1 in Karlevi, DR 26 in Laeborg, DR 48 in Hanning, DR 120 in Spentrup, and DR 331 in Gårdstånga.

The runic text indicates that Ásmundr and Freybjôrn raised the stone as a memorial their father Herbjôrn. Of the personal names mentioned in the text, Freybjôrn contains the Norse god Freyr as a theophoric name element and means "Freyr Bear." The name Ásmundr means "Devine Hand" and has a first element that refers to the Æsir, the name of the principal group of Norse gods. The names in the text also reflect a common practice of that time in Scandinavia of repeating an element in a parent's name in the names of the children. Here the bjôrn from the father's name, Herbjôrn, is repeated in the name one of the sons, Freybjôrn, to show the family relationship.

== Inscription ==
: asmuntr : auk : fraybiurn * litu kera : meki * siʀun * at * herbiurn * faþur : sin :
{} Ásmundr {} ok {} Freybjôrn {} létu gera {} merki {} sírún/sírýn {} at {} Herbjôrn, {} fôður {} sinn. {}
Ásmundr and Freybjôrn had the rune-decorated landmark made in memory of Herbjôrn, their father.
