= Skern Runestone =

Coordinates: 55°56′35″N 8°29′58″E

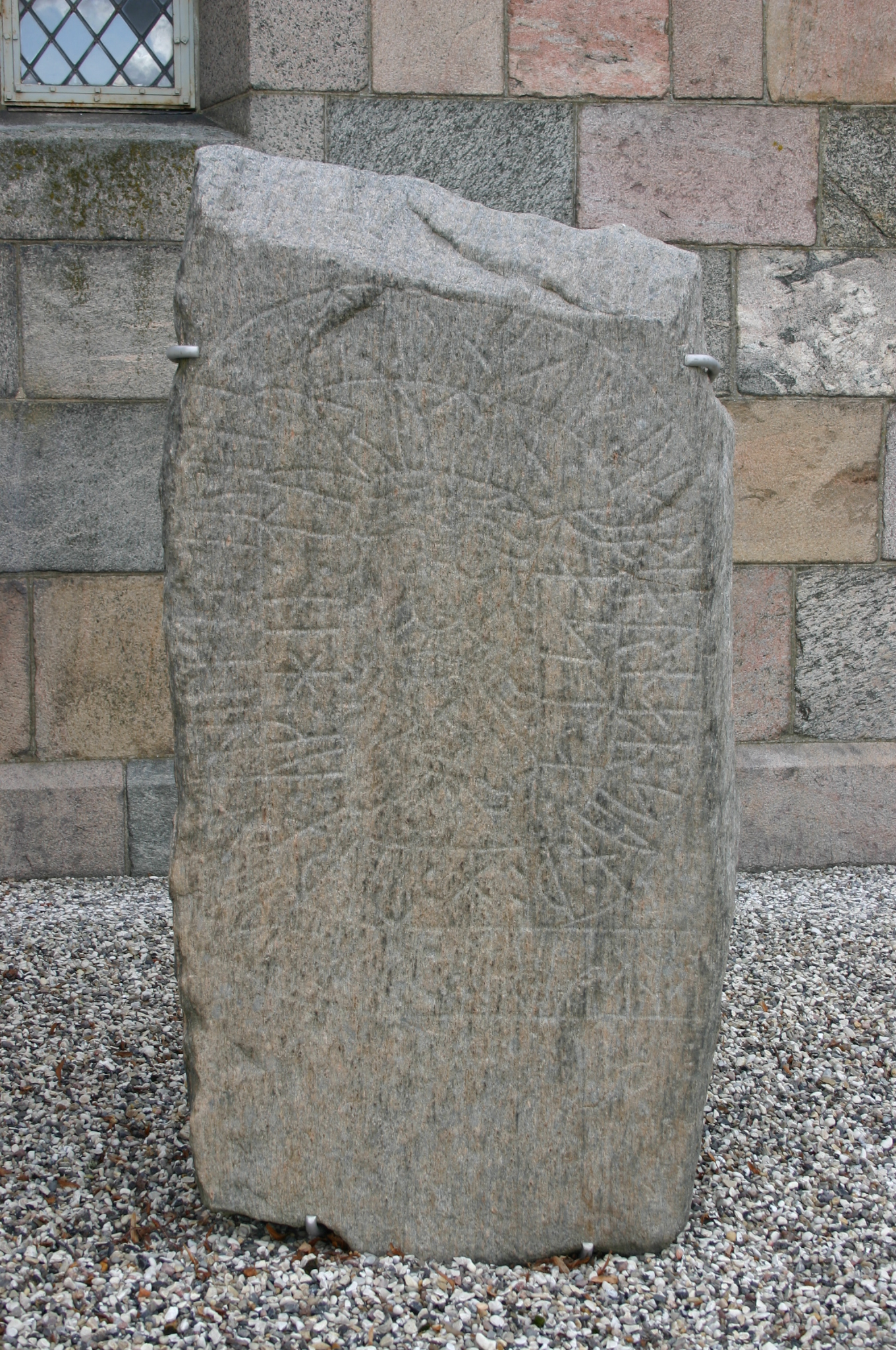
The Skern Runestone with its facial mask.

The Skern Runestone, designated as Danish Runic Inscription 81 or DR 81 in the Rundata catalog, is a Viking Age memorial runestone located in the small village of Skjern, Denmark between Viborg and Randers. The stone features a facial mask and a runic inscription which ends in a curse. A fragment of a second runestone designated as DR 80 was also found in Skjern.

== Description ==
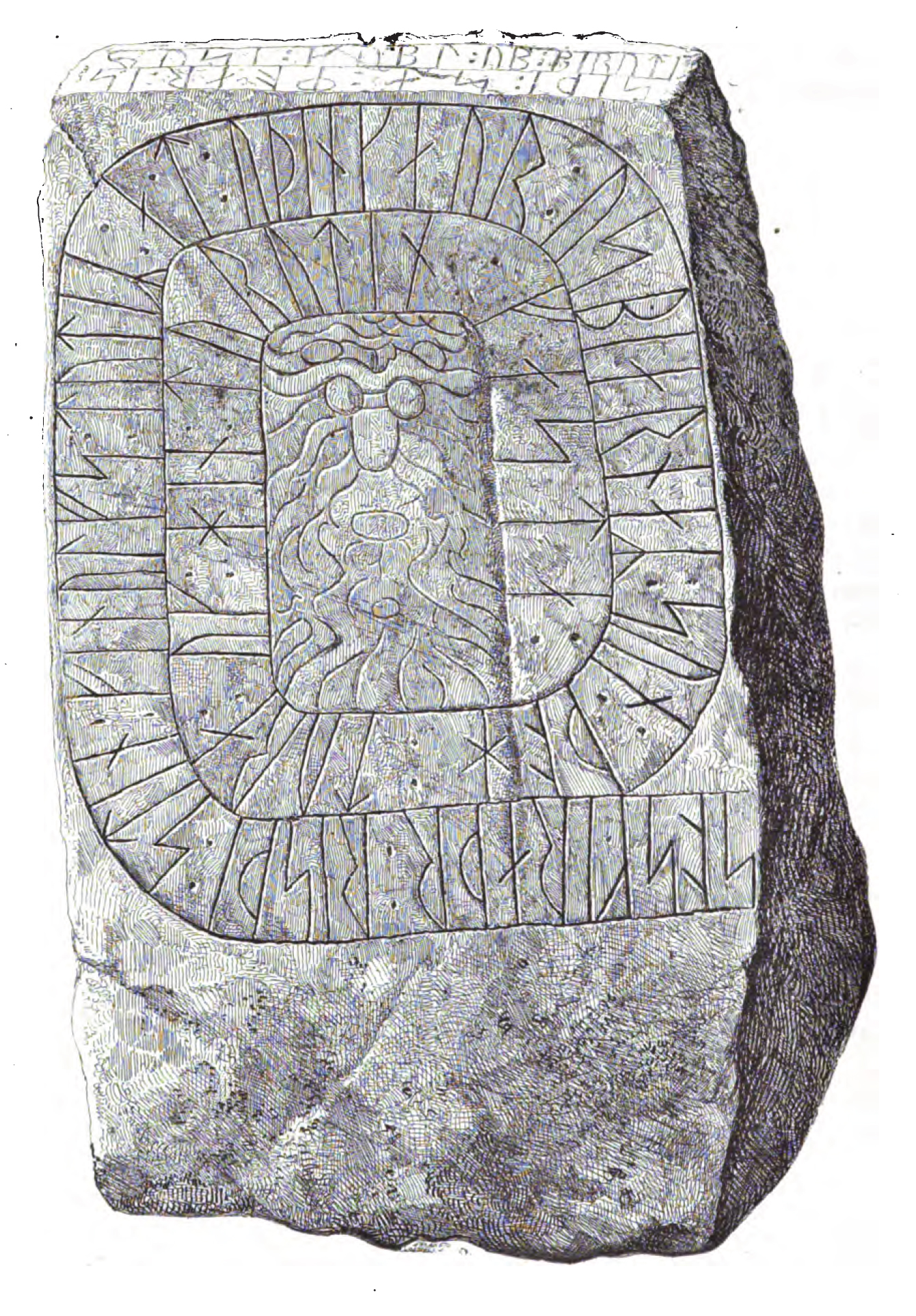
DR 81 from 1856 drawing.

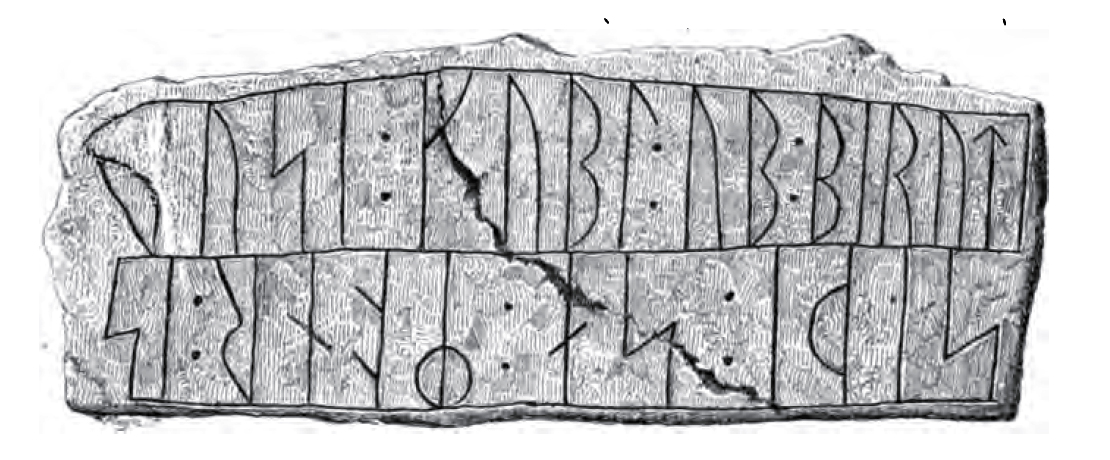
Top of DR 81 from 1856 drawing.

This inscription consists of runic text in the younger futhark that circles a facial mask, with text listed as line B located on the top of the stone. The inscription is classified as being carved in runestone style RAK, which is the oldest classification. This classification is used for inscriptions where the runic bands have straight ends without any attached serpent or beast heads. The facial mask on this stone is a common motif and is found on several other Scandinavian runestones including DR 62 in Sjelle, DR 66 in Århus, DR 258 in Bösarp, the now-lost DR 286 in Hunnestad, DR 314 in Lund, DR 335 in Västra Strö, Vg 106 in Lassegården, Sö 86 in Åby ägor, Sö 112 in Kolunda, Sö 167 in Landshammar, Sö 367 in Släbro, Nä 34 in Nasta, U 508 in Gillberga, U 670 in Rölunda, U 678 in Skokloster, U 824 in Holms, U 1034 in Tensta, and U 1150 in Björklinge, and on the Sjellebro Stone. The Skern Runestone was discovered in 1843 in the foundation of a staircase in the ruins of a local castle dating from the 14th century, which had been razed in 1626 during the Thirty Years War. Before the cultural and historic significance of runestones was understood, they were often re-used in the construction of roads, bridges, walls, and buildings. The inscription has been dated as being carved approximately 1000 C.E.

The runic text states that the stone was raised by a woman named Sasgerðr in memory of Óðinkárr Ásbjǫrnson, who is described in Old Norse as þan dyra meaning "valued" or "the dear one." The runic text ends in a curse, which is on line B on the top of the stone, and calls anyone who would break the monument a siþi. This word is translated in Rundata as "sorcerer," but actually refers to a "seiðr worker." During the Viking Age the practice of seiðr by men had connotations of unmanliness or effeminacy known as ergi, and aspects of this sorcery ran counter to the male ideal of forthright, open behavior. Other runestones with similar curses include DR 83 in Sønder Vinge, DR 209 in Glavendrup, DR 230 from Tryggevælde, DR 338 in Glemminge, and Vg 67 in Saleby.

Two of names on the stone have been of interest to scholars. Sasgerðr is otherwise unknown, but is likely derived from the common name Ásgerðr, perhaps as a result of children's speech. The runes uþinkaur are translated as Óðinkárr, a theophoric name that refers to the Norse pagan god Odin and a curl of hair, suggesting that the name originally may have referred to cultic initiates who grew long hair. In this connection, it is possible that the drott or lord from the text could refer to Odin, although it is likely that the lord was a king or other person of rank. The name Óðinkárr is also used in the inscriptions in a possible cultic reference on DR 4 in Hedeby, DR 133 in Skivum, and DR 239 in Gørlev. In addition, it has been suggested that Kárr is used as the name of a cultic initiate on inscription Vg 56 in Källby and the son of a Norse priest on Vg 73 in Synnerby.

DR 81 is known locally as the Skjern-sten 2.

soskiriþr : risþi : stin : finulfs : tutiʀ : at : uþinkaur : usbiarnaʀ : sun : þoh : tura : uk : hin : turutin:fasta :
Sasgærþr {} resþi {} sten, {} Finulfs {} dottiʀ, {} at {} Oþinkor {} Asbiarna {} sun, {} þan {} dyra {} ok {} hin {} drottinfasta. {}
Sasgerðr, Finnulfr's daughter, raised the stone, in memory of Óðinkárr Ásbjǫrn's son, the valued and loyal to his lord.

siþi : sa : monr : is ¶ : þusi : kubl : ub : biruti
Siþi {} sa {} mannr {} æs {} {} þøsi {} kumbl {} of {} briuti.
A sorcerer (be) the man who breaks this monument!

== DR 80 ==
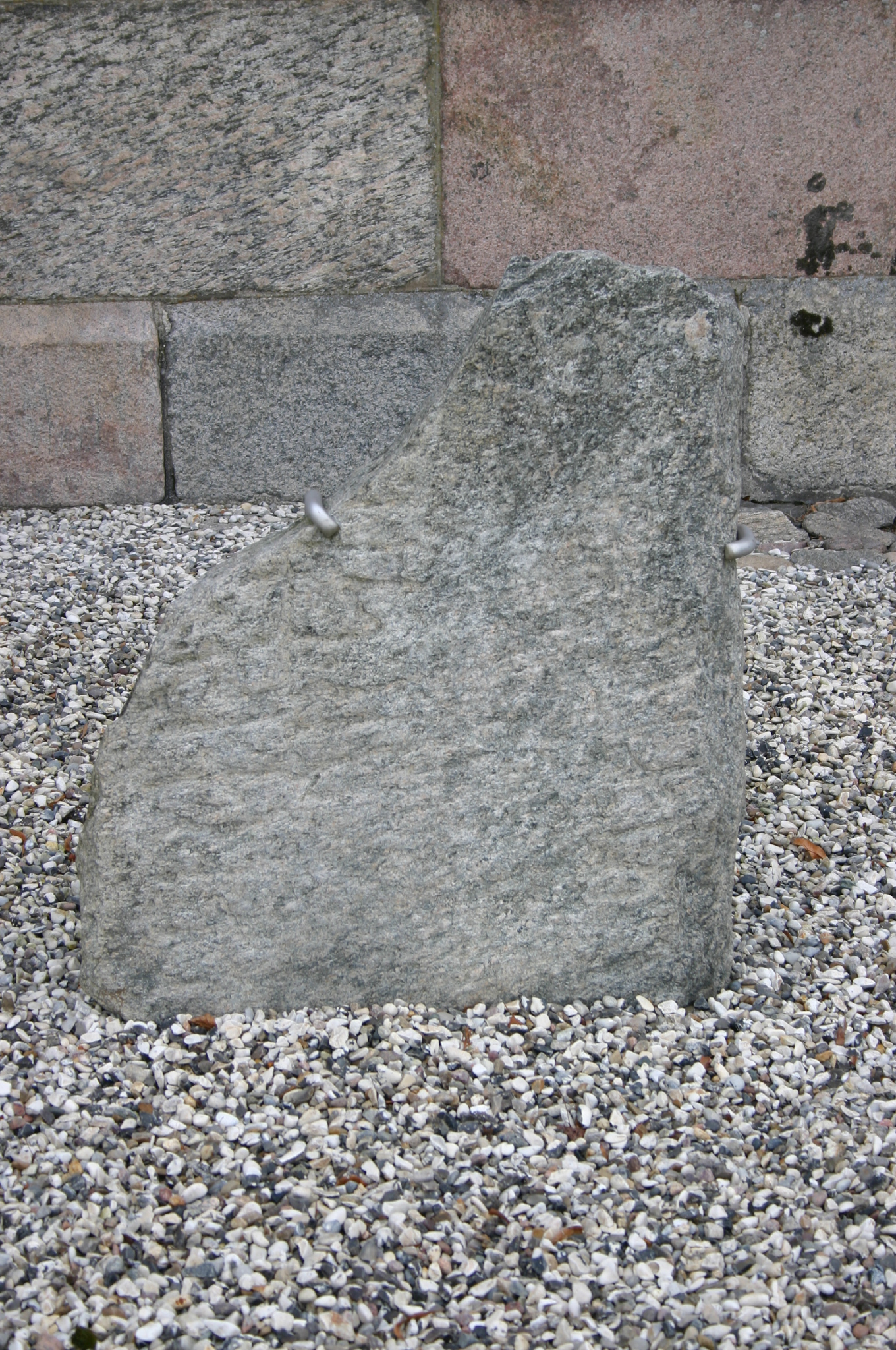
The runestone fragment DR 80.

DR 80 is the Rundata designation for a fragment of a runestone that was discovered in the 1830s in the foundation of a church in Skjern. It has been suggested that the stone is associated with DR 81, with Ásbjǫrn referring to the same person on both stones. In addition, it has been speculated that the name Harald may refer to Harold Bluetooth, who was a king of Denmark from about 958 to 985 or 986.

Locally, the stone is known as the Skjern-sten 1.

... usbiaur... ... ¶ ... ¶ ...ur : si(n) ¶ ... harals : h...
... Asbior[n] ... {} ... {} ... {} sin {} ... Haralds {} ...
... Ásbjǫrn ... ... ... his ... Haraldr's ...

== See also ==
- Runic magic
