= Nasta Runestone =

Viking Age memorial artifact in Sweden

Coordinates: 59°20′25″N 15°21′02″E

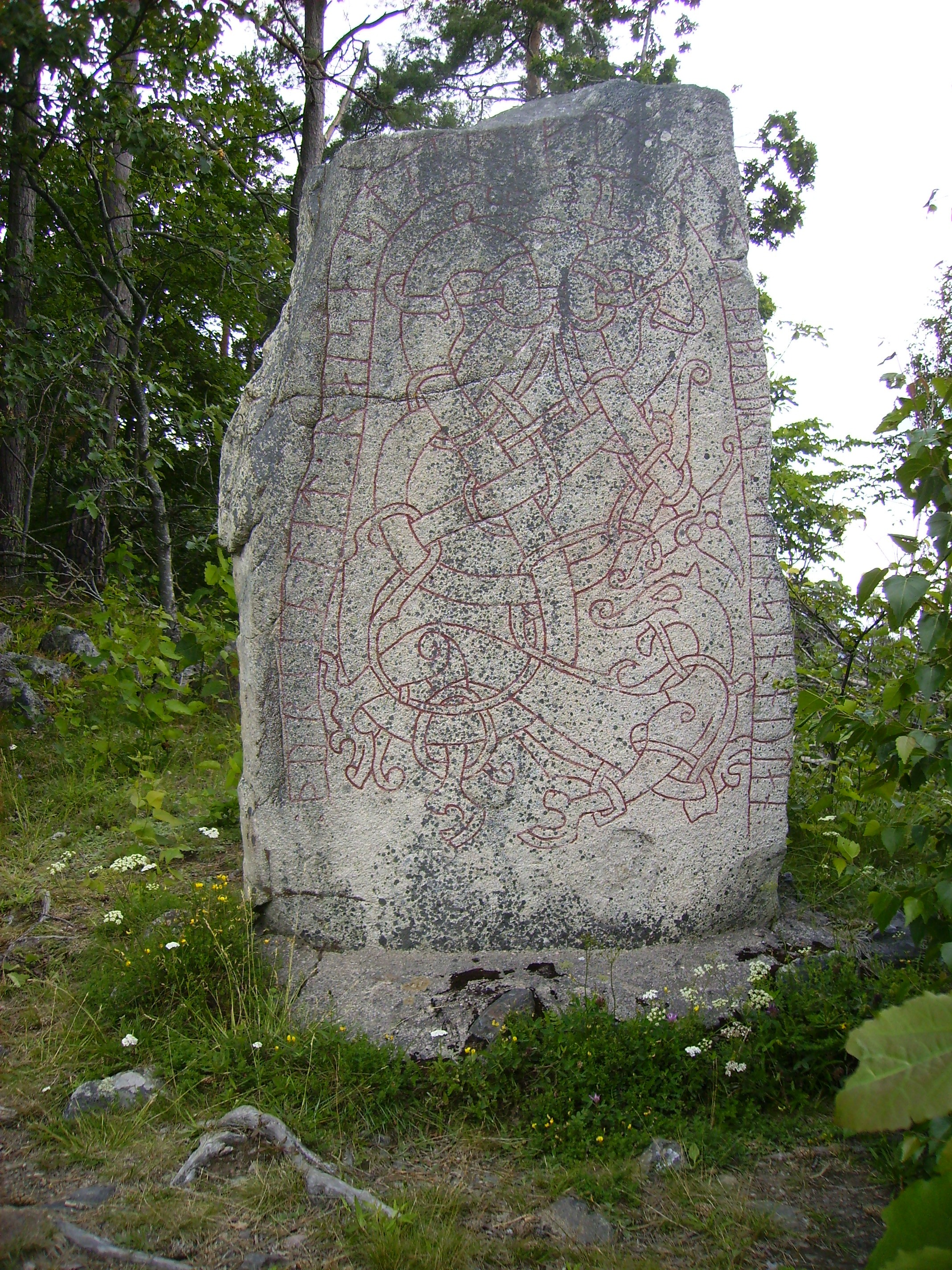
Inscription Nä 34 in Nasta.

The Nasta Runestone, listed as Nä 34 in the Rundata catalog, is a Viking Age memorial runestone located in Nasta, which is 3 kilometers northwest of Glanshammar, Örebro County, Sweden, which was in the historic province of Närke.

== Description ==
The inscription on Nä 34 consists of runic text in the younger futhark within a runic text band that arches around the edge of the stone, and a depiction of a beast and an intertwined serpent and a facial mask. The inscription on this granite stone, which is 2.25 meters in height, is classified as perhaps being carved in runestone style Pr3, which is also known as Urnes style. This is the classification for runic bands with beast or serpent heads depicted in profile with almond shaped eyes. The question regarding the proper classification for Nä 34 is that the runic text band has no attached beast or serpent heads, but the depiction of the serpent and beast depicted have some characteristics typical of the Urnes style. The facial mask on this stone, which is just under the arch of the text band, is a common motif and is found on several other Scandinavian runestones including DR 62 in Sjelle, DR 66 in Århus, DR 81 in Skjern, DR 258 in Bösarp, the now-lost DR 286 in Hunnestad, DR 314 in Lund, DR 335 in Västra Strö, Vg 106 in Lassegården, Sö 86 in Åby ägor, Sö 112 in Kolunda, Sö 167 in Landshammar, Sö 367 in Släbro, U 508 in Gillberga, U 670 in Rölunda, U 678 in Skokloster, U 824 in Holms, U 1034 in Tensta, and U 1150 in Björklinge, and on the Sjellebro Stone. The stone was noted as being on a pile of rocks during the initial survey of Swedish runestones in the 1600s by Johannes Bureus. As it was near a main road, the stone was raised in 1672 by Johan Hadorph for the Eriksgata of king Charles XI. It was noted that local people in the 1700s sometimes bit the stone as a cure for toothaches and left pins or nails on the stone as offerings for good crops. In 1952 the stone was moved six meters from the south side to the north side of the road.

The runic text states that the stone was raised as a memorial by a woman named Þórheiðr for her son named Lyðbjôrn, who is described in Old Norse as being nytan, which is a rare word that is translated as "capable" but may mean "bright and cheerful." The text is very worn and was somewhat damaged in the 1840s when a farmer attempted to "improve" the inscription.

The stone is known locally as the Nastastenen or, since it is the only runestone in the Rinkaby synod, as the Rinkabystenen.

== Inscription ==
=== Transliteration of the runes into Latin characters ===
: þureiþ : lit : raisa : stein : eftir : lyþbyurn : sun sin : nutan :

=== Transcription into Old Norse ===
Þorhæiðr let ræisa stæin æftiʀ Lyðbiorn, sun sinn nytan.

=== Translation in English ===
Þórheiðr had the stone raised in memory of Lyðbjôrn, her capable son.
