= Sjellebro Stone =

Coordinates: 56°24′15″N 10°14′27″E

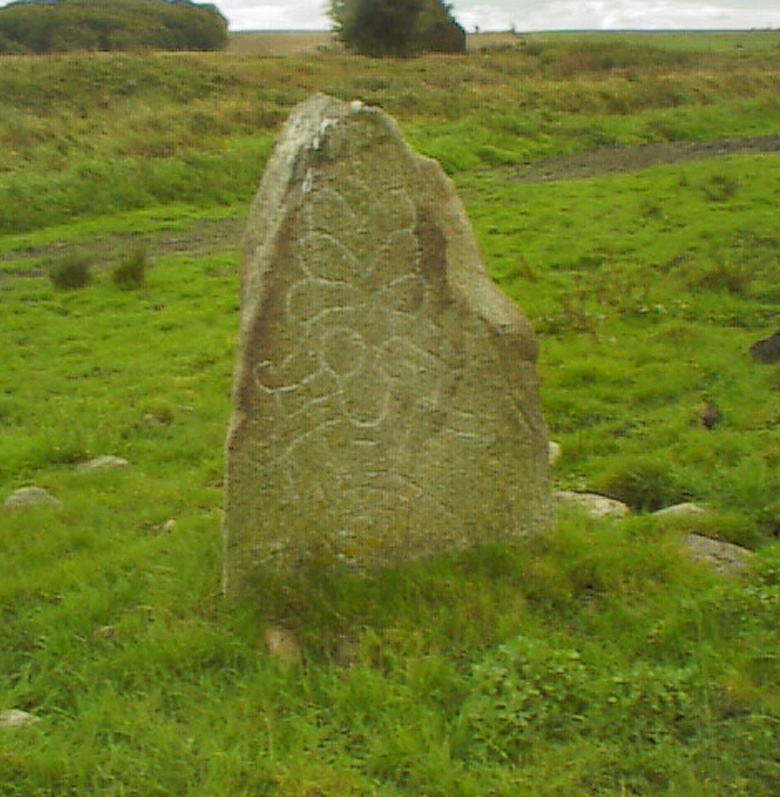
The Sjellebro image stone.

The Sjellebro Stone is a Viking Age image stone located at Sjellbro, which is about 12 kilometers southeast of Randers, Denmark. The stone is inscribed with a facial mask.

== Description ==
The Sjellbro Stone is about 1.7 meters in height and features the facial mask of a man. Similar to other image stones, today it is difficult to determine the meaning of the inscription. The facial mask on this granite stone is a common motif and is found on several Scandinavian runestones including DR 62 in Sjelle, DR 66 in Århus, DR 81 in Skern, DR 258 in Bösarp, the now-lost DR 286 in Hunnestad, DR 314 in Lund, DR 335 in Västra Strö, Vg 106 in Lassegården, Sö 86 in Åby ägor, Sö 112 in Kolunda, Sö 167 in Landshammar, Sö 367 in Släbro, Nä 34 in Nasta, U 508 in Gillberga, U 670 in Rölunda, U 678 in Skokloster, U 824 in Holms, U 1034 in Tensta, and U 1150 in Björklinge. Of these mask stones, the Sjellebro Stone is the only one without any runic inscription. The Sjellebro Stone was discovered in 1951 lying with its inscription side down. It is located near where a ford existed for a Viking Age road that crossed a small river. The inscription is dated as having been carved between 850-1050 C.E. based on the style of the mask, which is classified as being in the Mammen style.

The stone is known locally as the Sjellebrostenen. The stone has been listed in catalogs as either DK MJy 69 or DR EM1985;539.
