= Battle of Fladstrand =

1712 naval battle of the Great Northern War

- Part of the Great Northern War
Date	30 April 1712 (O.S.); 11 May 1712 (N.S.) (Note: The Swedish calendar was abolished on "30 February 1712", reverting to the Old-Style Julian calendar the next day on 1 March 1712 (corresponding to 11 March 1712 N.S.). The Battle of Fladstrand thus occurred on 30 April 1712 according to both the Julian and now-deprecated Swedish calendar (corresponding to 11 May 1712 N.S.). Some sources incorrectly report the New-Style date as "11 April 1712", presumably due to confusion with the later Action off Fladstrand on 10 April 1717 (N.S.).)
Location	Fladstrand, modern day Frederikshavn
Result	Inconclusive

Belligerents
(yes) Swedish Empire	Denmark-Norway

Commanders and leaders
(Swedish Empire) Carl Georg Siöblad	(Denmark–Norway) Hans Knoff

Strength
7 ships with 330 guns	5 ships with 158 guns

Casualties and losses
unknown	44 dead

The Battle of Fladstrand (Note: Danish and Norwegian: Slaget ved Fladstrand. Swedish: Slaget vid Fladestrand.) was a naval battle which took place on 11 May 1712 (N.S.) near Fladstrand, (Modern day Frederikshavn) Jutland, between Swedish and Danish forces. It was part of the Great Northern War.

The Swedish fleet, under Carl Georg Siöblad, consisted of 7 ships with 330 guns, and the Danish fleet, under Hans Knoff, consisted of 5 ships with 158 guns. The battle lasted about 2 hours. Denmark suffered 44 casualties.

== Ships involved ==
=== Sweden (Siöblad) ===
Fredrika 52
Kalmar 46
Stettin 46
Elfsborg 42
Warberg 42/52
Charlotte 38
Stenbock 36

=== Denmark (Knoff) ===
Fyen 52
Raae 30
Soridder 28
Leopard 24
Loss 24
