= Södermanland Runic Inscription Fv1948;295 =

Viking age memorial runestone

Coordinates: 58.7437°N 16.7384°E

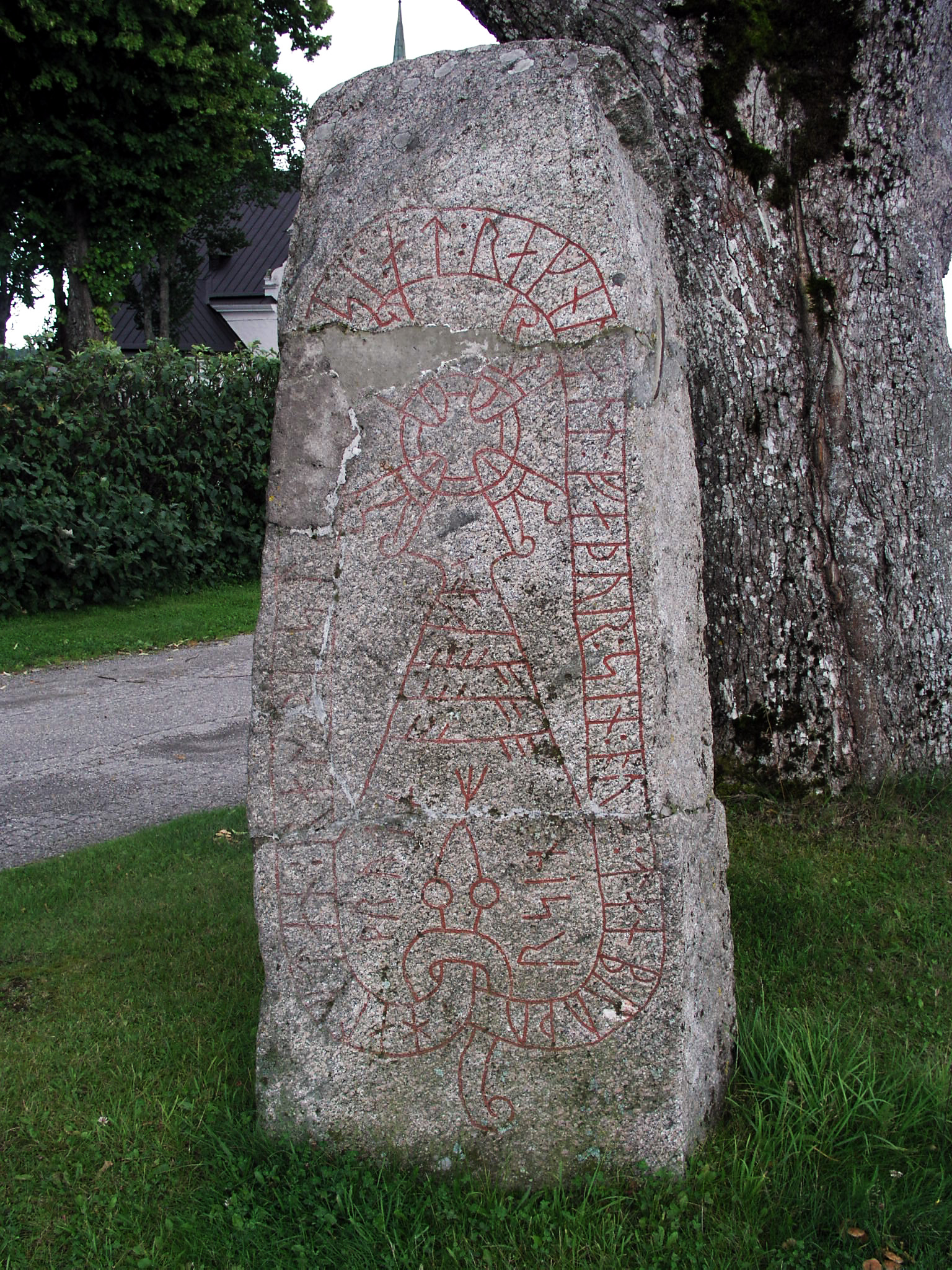
Sö Fv1948;295 in Prästgården.

Sö Fv1948;295 is the Rundata catalog number for a Viking Age memorial runestone that is located in Prästgården, which is just west of Jönåker, Södermanland County, Sweden. It commemorates two men who are described as being thegns.

== Description ==
This runestone was found in two pieces during construction work at a rectory at the Lunda church in 1947. The stone was repaired and raised in the nearby churchyard cemetery. The inscription consists of runic text in the younger futhark carved on a serpent that encircles a Christian cross. The runestone, which is 2.3 meters in height, is classified as being carved in runestone style Fp. This is the classification for inscriptions with text bands that end in serpent or beast heads depicted as seen from above. Runestones are often dated based upon comparative linguistic and stylistic analysis, and the inscription on the stone at Prästgården has been dated to approximately the period of 1020 to 1050 C.E.

A portion of the runic text was damaged but was reconstructed based upon similar language on other runestones. The text states that Halfdan raised the stone in memory of his father Ragnvaldr and his brother Dan. Although it might seem unusual for one family to have two brothers that are named Dan and Halfdan, a similar situation in another family is documented on runestone U 511 in Mälsta. The father Ragnvaldr and the brother Dan are described as being Þegns or thegns. The exact status of thegns in Scandinavia is unclear, although the term was borrowed from England, where it was used for royal or military retainers. Scandinavian thegns appear to have been powerful local landowners but it is unclear whether their status reflected royal sponsorship or power. The last portion of the runic text, sin þrutaʀ þiak(n)a, is located outside of the serpent. The runes sin þrutaʀ are located on each side of the base of the cross, with the final ʀ rune being represented in the shape of the tongue of the serpent. The runes þiak(n)a for þegna or "Þegns" are hidden in the base of the cross as "secret runes." The phrase þróttar þegna or "Þegns of strength" is also used on Sö 367 in Släbro and in its singular form on Sö 90 in Lövhulta, Sö 112 in Kolunda, Sö 151 in Lövsund, Sö 158 in Österberga, and Sö 170 in Nälberga.

The Rundata designation for this Södermanland inscription, Sö Fv1948;295, refers to the year and page number of the issue of Fornvännen in which the runestone was first described.

== Inscription ==
=== Transliteration of the runes into Latin characters ===
: halftan ÷ rasþi : st(a)- ...si : at : raknualt : faþur : sin : ouk : tan * bruþur sin þrutaʀ þiak(n)a

=== Transcription into Old Norse ===
Halfdan reisti stei[n þenn]a at Ragnvald, fôður sinn, ok Dan, bróður sinn, þróttar þegna.

=== Translation in English ===
Halfdan raised this stone in memory of Ragnvaldr, his father, and Dan, his brother, Þegns of strength.
