= Carl Georg Siöblad =

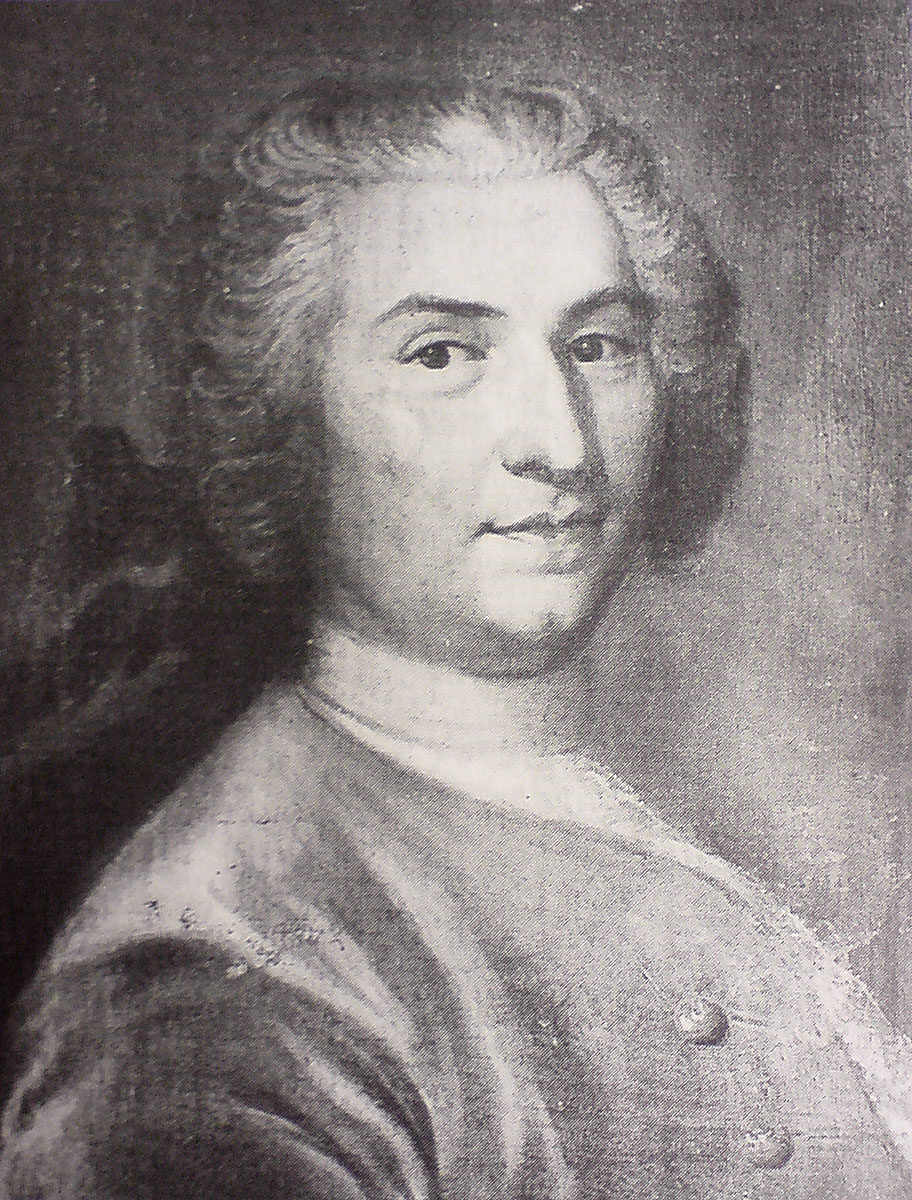

Governor of Malmöhus County
- In office 1740–1754
- Preceded by: Wilhelm Bennet
- Succeeded by: Georg Bogislaus Staël von Holstein

Personal details
- Born: 2 November 1683 Julita Parish, Södermanland
- Died: 1 September 1754 (aged 70) Balkåkra parish, Scania

Carl Georg Siöblad (2 November 1683 – 1 September 1754) was a Swedish naval officer who served as Governor of Malmöhus County and Blekinge County

== Biography ==
In 1734, he was appointed governor of Blekinge County and in 1740 he became Governor of Malmö.

== Personal life ==
He was married to Countess Beata Elisabeth Stenbock (1693-1765), daughter of Johanna Eleonora De la Gardie (1661-1708) and Count Erik Gustaf Stenbock. Their daughter Ebba Christina Siöbladh (1720- 1786) was the grandmother of nobleman Eric Ruuth (1746–1820), Lord of Marsvinsholm.

== See also ==
- Stenbock
