= Eric Ruuth =

Swedish nobleman

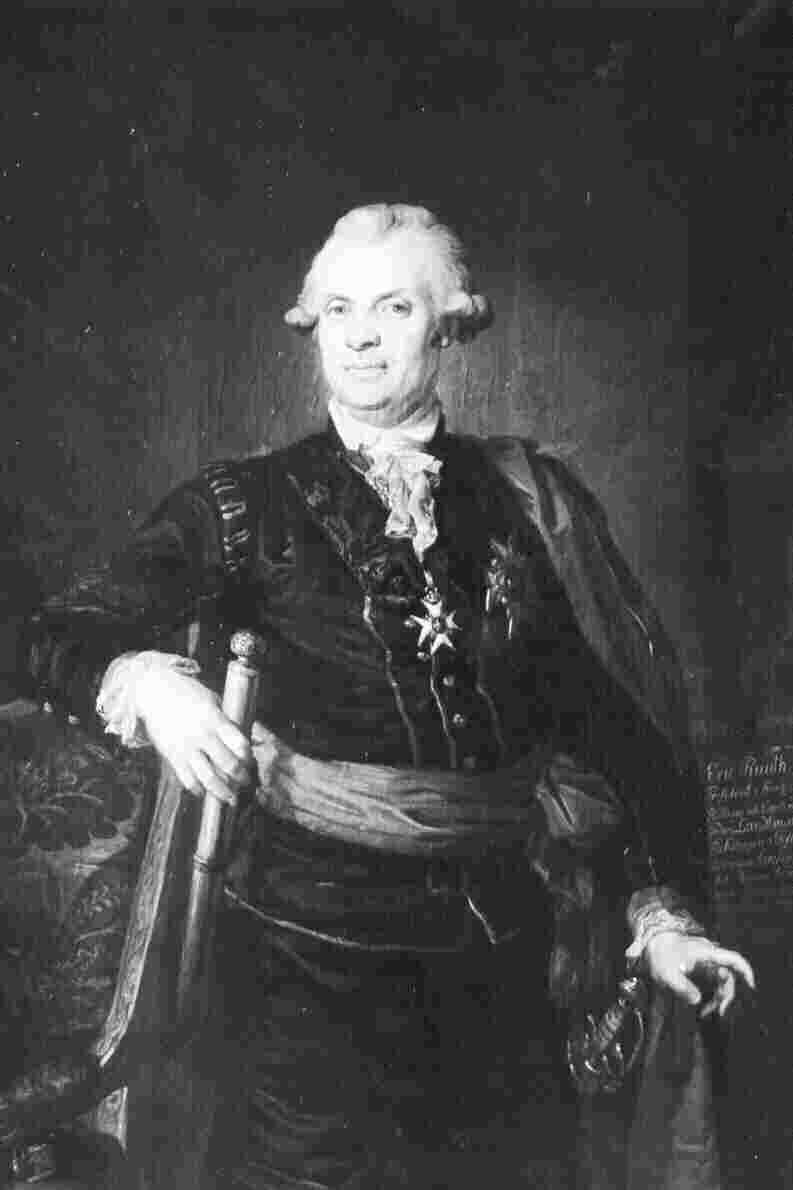

Governor-General of Swedish Pomerania
- In office 1792–1796
- Preceded by: Fredrik Vilhelm von Hessenstein
- Succeeded by: Hans Henric von Essen

Personal details
- Born: 24 October 1746 Stockholm, Sweden
- Died: 25 May 1820 (aged 73) Klara, Stockholm

Eric Ruuth (24 October 1746 – 25 May 1820) was a Swedish nobleman and the owner of Marsvinsholm Castle. He served as the Governor-General of Swedish Pomerania from 1792 to 1796. With his coal mine he started the company that would eventually become Höganäs AB.

== Biography ==
He was born on 24 October 1746 to Gustaf Ruuth of Finland (1697–1757) and Baroness Ebba Christina Siöbladh. She was the daughter of Baron Carl Georg Siöblad, Lord of Marsvinsholm and Countess Beata Elisabeth Stenbock.

From 1782 to 1786 he made extensive renovations at Marsvinsholm Castle. During renovations, he destroyed the Hunnestad Monument, the largest and most famous of the Viking Age monuments in Scania.

In 1786 he invited a Swiss cheesemaker to Marsvinsholm Castle. A few years later, Swiss style cheese were being produced in Sweden. He served as the Governor-General of Swedish Pomerania from 1792 to 1796. He was made a Swedish count in 1792. He died on 25 May 1820.

== See also ==
- Hunnestad Monument
