= Västergötland Runic Inscription 40 =

Viking runic inscription discovered in Sweden

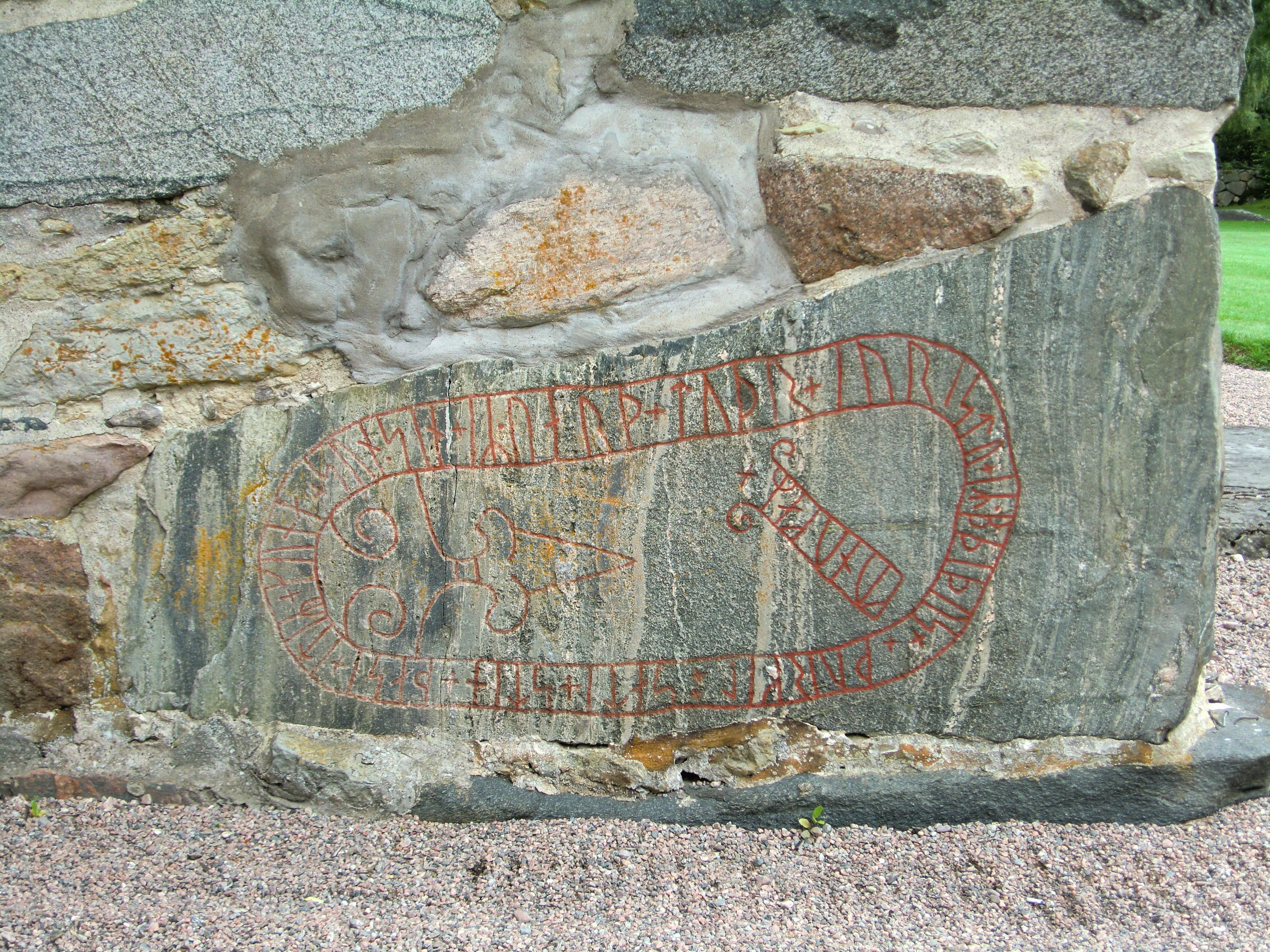
Vg 40

The Västergötland Runic Inscription 40 is a Viking Age runestone engraved in Old Norse with the Younger Futhark runic alphabet inserted into the wall of the church of Råda, in Lidköping Municipality, Västergötland, and the style of the runestone is possibly runestone style RAK. It was made in memory of a man who fought and died in a battle between kings, "when kings fought each other". A similar phrase appears on the Danish mask stone.

== Inscription ==
+ þurkil ÷ sati + stin + þasi + itiʀ + kuna + sun · sin + iʀ · uarþ + tuþr + i uristu + iʀ · bþiþus + kunukaʀ ×
{} Þorkell {} satti {} stæin {} þannsi {} æftiʀ {} Gunna, {} sun {} sinn. {} Eʀ {} varð {} dauðr {} i orrustu, {} eʀ {} barðus {} kunungaʀ. {}
"Þorkell placed this stone in memory of Gunni, his son, who died in battle when kings fought each other."
