= Lund 1 Runestone =

Runestone in Lund, Sweden

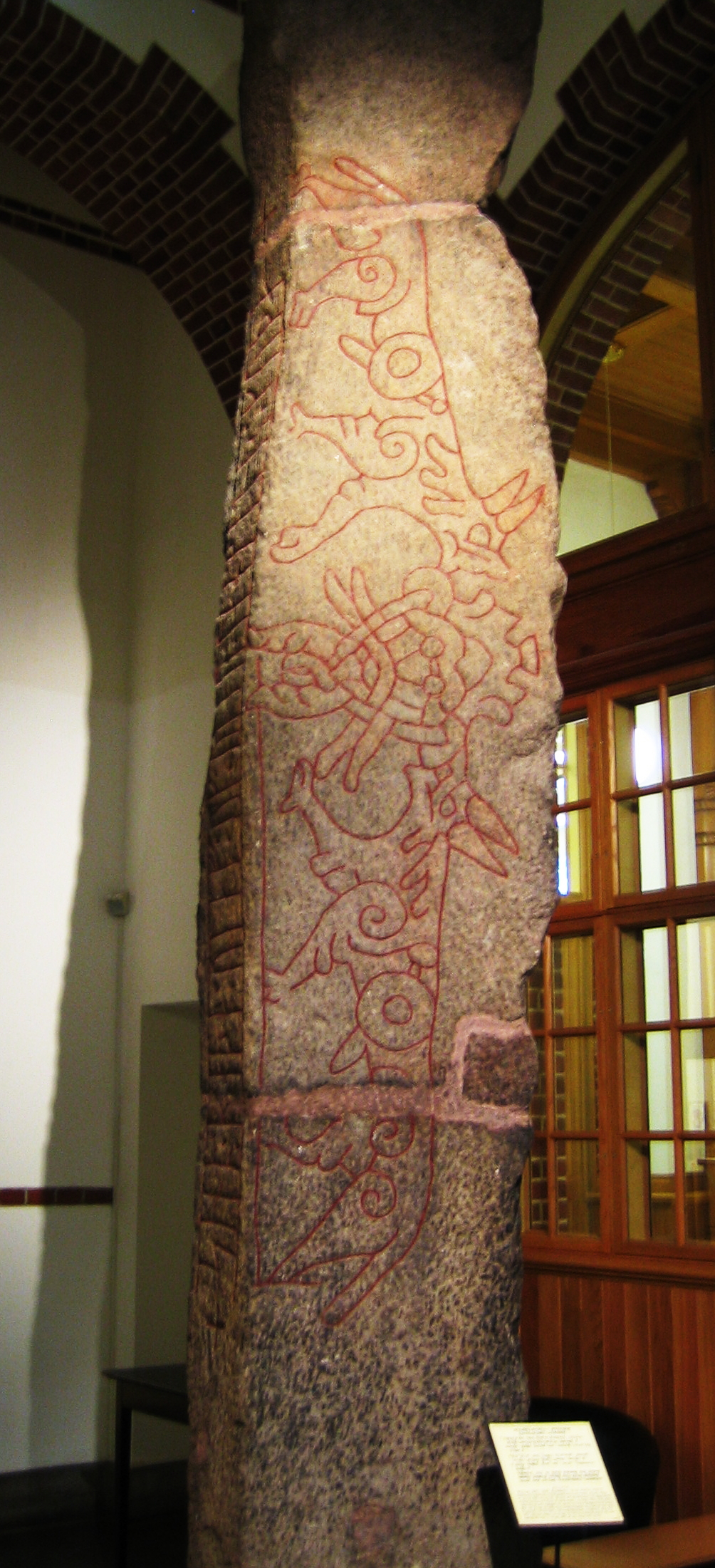
Side C of the Lund 1 Runestone in the entrance hall of Lund University Library in Sweden.

The Lund 1 Runestone, designated as DR 314 in the Rundata catalog, is a Viking Age memorial runestone originally located on the grounds of the All Saints Church in Lund, Scania, Sweden.

== Description ==
The Lund 1 Runestone is a granite stone pillar nearly four meters in height that has inscriptions carved on its four sides. There are runic inscriptions carved on sides A and B of the stone, images of two animals identified as wolves and a man's mask on side C, and the mask of a lion face on side D. The runic inscriptions are classified as being carved in runestone style RAK, which is the classification of the oldest inscriptions. This is the runestone-style classification of inscriptions where the ends of the text bands are straight and there are no attached serpent or animal heads. The inscription, which has a Danish Rundata catalog number because Scania was part of historical Denmark during the Viking Age, is dated as being carved after the Jelling stones of Denmark.

The two wolves on Side C are apparently armed with a shield and sword strapped to their bodies. The depiction of the wolves shows a mane and pointed ears similar to that of the wolf on inscription DR 284 of the Hunnestad Monument and on the DR 271 in Tullstorp. The man's mask between the two wolves is similar to those depicted on two other runestones in Scania, inscriptions DR 258 in Bösarp and DR 335 in Västra Strö. The lion face mask on Side D is similar to that depicted on the inscription DR 66 from Denmark, which is also known as the Århus 4 image stone or the Mask Stone. Other inscriptions with facial masks include DR 62 in Sjelle, DR 81 in Skern, the now-lost DR 286 in Hunnestad, Vg 106 in Lassegården, Sö 86 in Åby ägor, Sö 112 in Kolunda, Sö 167 in Landshammar, Sö 367 in Släbro, Nä 34 in Nasta, U 508 in Gillberga, U 670 in Rölunda, U 678 in Skokloster, U 824 in Örsundsbro, U 1034 in Tensta, and U 1150 in Björklinge, and on the Sjellebro Stone.

The runic text states that the stone is a memorial raised by a man named Þorgísl in memory of his two brothers, Ólafr and Óttarr. The text refers to "stones" that were raised, so the original memorial consisted of at least one additional raised stone. Ólafr and Óttarr are described as being landmennr góða, or "good landowners." A similar Old Norse phrase praising the deceased, landmanna beztr meaning "best of landholders," is present on the inscriptions on memorial runestones Sö 338 in Turinge and DR 133 in Skivum, Denmark. Landmennr is sometimes translated as "land-men." Some believe that the term land-men refers to a title that is something higher than a simple free farmer, such as a rich farmer or squire, although there is dispute regarding this.

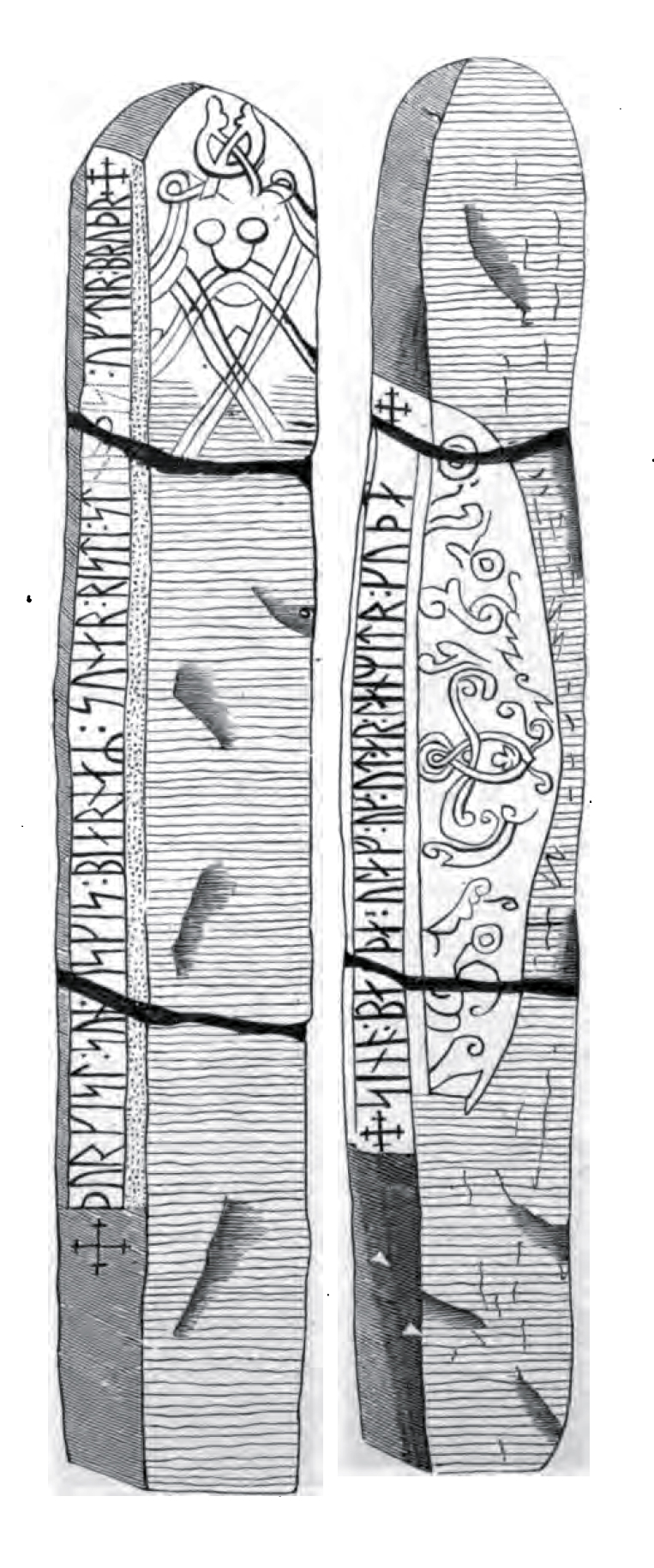
Drawing of the runestone published in 1878.

The name of the father of the stones sponsor, Ásgeirr Bjôrn, has several name elements that were common at that time in Scandinavia. Ásgeirr means "Divine Spear" and contains a name element referring to the Æsir, the Norse pagan gods, while Bjôrn means "Bear." Þorgísl also contains a god's name as an element and means "Thor's Hostage."

The Lund 1 Runestone was discovered in the ruins of a monastery in 1682, where it had apparently been re-used as material in the construction of that building. Before the historic significance of runestones was understood, they were often used as materials in the construction of roads, bridges, and buildings. The stone was found broken at two locations, but in 1868 it was repaired and raised at the Lundagård. Since 1957, the runestone has been located in the entrance hall of the library at the Lund University. Locally the runestone is referred to as the Lundastenen ("the Lund Stone") or the Lundagårdsstenen ("the Lundagård Stone").

== Inscription ==
=== Transliteration of the runes into Latin characters ===
§A + þu(r)[kisl ÷ sun ÷ i]sgis ÷ biarnaʀ ÷ sunaʀ ÷ risþi ÷ sti[no ÷ þisi] ÷ (u)(f)tiʀ ÷ bruþr +
§B + sino ÷ baþa ÷ ulaf ÷ uk ÷ utar ÷ lanmitr ÷ kuþa +

=== Transcription into Old Norse ===
§A Þorgísl, sonr Ásgeirs Bjarnar sonar, reisti steina þessa eptir brœðr
§B sína báða, Ólaf ok Óttar, landmennr góða.

=== Translation in English ===
§A Þorgísl, son of Ásgeirr Bjôrn's son, raised these stones in memory of both of his brothers,
§B Ólafr and Óttarr, good landholders.
