= Uppland Runic Inscription 678 =

Coordinates: 59.7045°N 17.6245°E

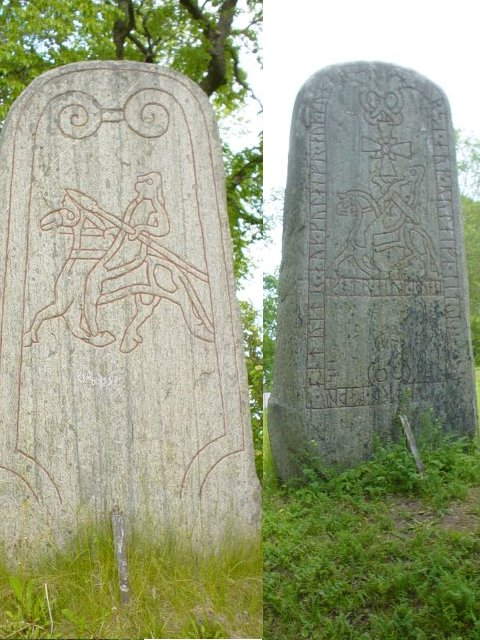
- Created: 11th Century (Possibly older)
- Discovered: Skokloster, Uppland, Sweden
- Runemaster: Fot

Text – Native
- Old Norse : Andvettr ok GullæifR ok "Gunnarr ok Horsi ok "RolæifR letu ræisa stæin at Thordh, fadhur sinn. Fotr hiogg runaR.

Translation
- Andvéttr and Gulleifr and Gunnarr and Haursi and Hródhleifr had the stone raised in memory of Thórdhr, their father. Fótr cut the runes.

U 678 is the Rundata catalog number for a Viking Age image stone with a runic inscription located in Skokloster, Uppland, Sweden.

== Description ==
This runestone was found walled inside a church at Skokloster, and has been moved to a location behind the church. One side of the stone has an image of a man on a horse, and the other side has a similar image with a surrounding runic inscription within runic bands. At the top of the second side with the runic text is carved a man's mask above a Christian cross. Other runestones with a similar mask above a cross motif include inscriptions on Sö 86 in Åby, Sö 112 in Kolunda, Sö 367 in Släbro, Nä 34 in Nasta, and U 1034 in Tensta. Other inscriptions with facial masks include DR 62 in Sjelle, DR 81 in Skern, the now-lost DR 286 in Hunnestad, DR 314 in Lund, Vg 106 in Lassegården, Sö 167 in Landshammar, U 508 in Gillberga, U 670 in Rölunda, U 824 in Örsundsbro, and U 1150 in Björklinge, and on the Sjellebro Stone.

The inscription is signed by the runemaster Fot, who was active in the mid eleventh century. His signature in the runic text fotr × hiuk × runaR or Fotr hiogg runaR ('Fótr cut the runes') is located on the text bar under the figure on the horse. Other inscriptions signed by him include U 167 in Östra Ryds, U 177 in Stav, U 268 in Harby, U 464 in Edeby, U 605 in Stäket, U 638 in Mansängen, and U 945 in Danmarks. He is also noted for the consistency of his use of the punctuation mark × between the words of the runic inscription, and this mark is used to separate the words in the text on this stone. Due to the unusual imagery of the inscription, assumed to be from an earlier time period, it has been suggested that Fot used earlier carved imagery to add his new runic text to. This runestone is classified as being carved in runestone style RAK. This is the classification for inscriptions with runic text without dragon or serpent heads and where the ends of the runic bands are straight.

== Inscription ==
A transliteration of the runic inscription into roman letters is:

antuitr × auk × kulaifr × auk × kunar × auk × haursi × auk × rulaifR × litu [×] rai(s)[a] × s(t)[ain × a](t) × þorþ × faþur × sin fotr × hiuk × runaR

== See also ==
- List of runestones
