= Marsvinsholm Castle =

Castle in southern Sweden

- Marsvinsholms slott
- Ystad Municipality
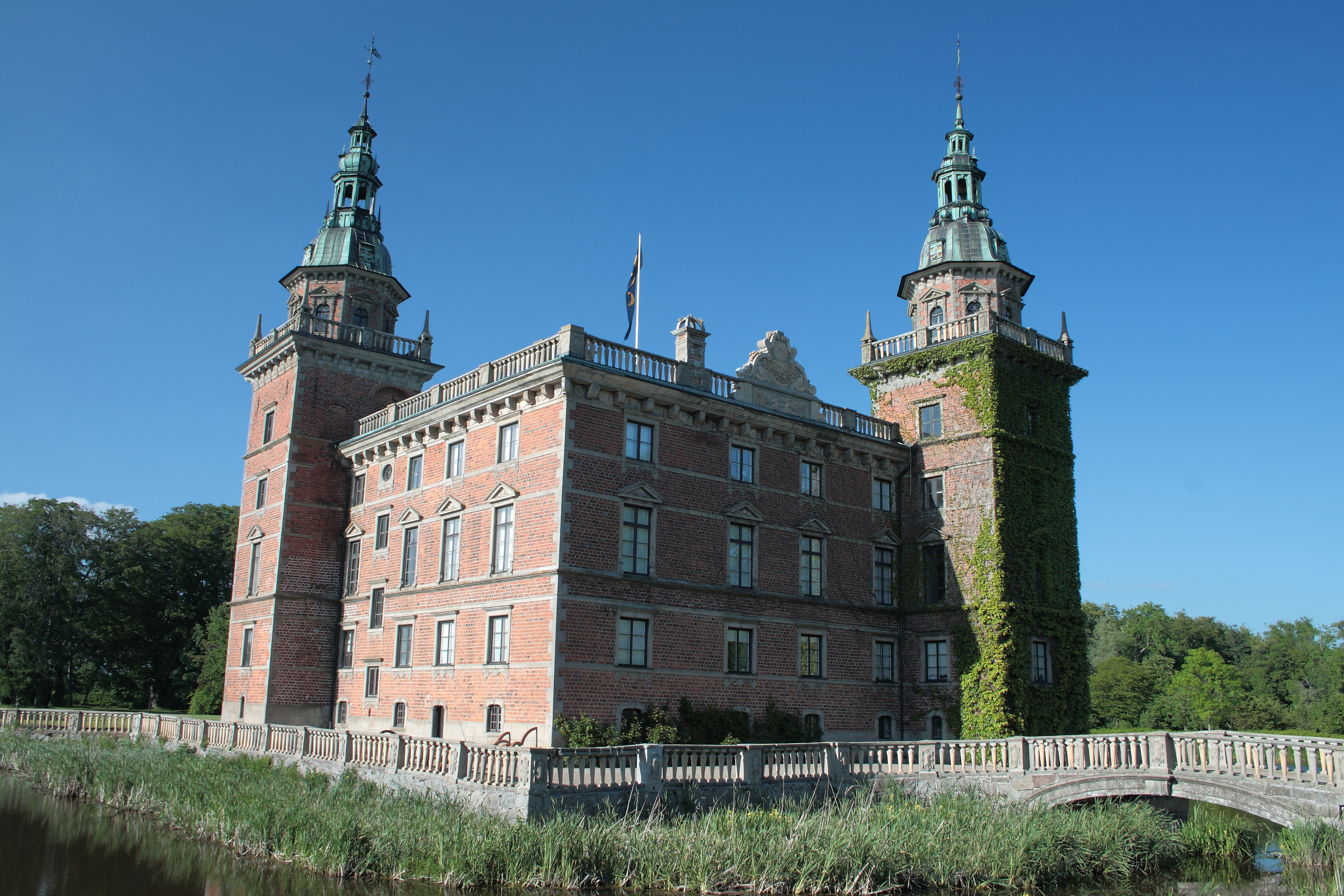
- Marsvinsholm Castle

Site information
- Type: Castle
- Owner: Tomas Iacobaeus
- Open to the public: No

Location
- Scania, Sweden
- Coordinates: 55.4632°N 13.7079°E

Site history
- Built: 1644-48
- Built by: Otte Marsvin

Marsvinsholm Castle (Swedish: Marsvinsholms slott) is situated in Ystad Municipality, Scania, in southern Sweden, 12 kilometres (7.5 mi) from Ystad.

== History ==
The estate was first known as Bosøe, Borsøe and Bordsyø and is known from the 14th century. During the late 14th century, it became part of the royal Danish crown land, and was owned by king Valdermar Atterdag and later by his daughter, queen Margrethe.

Around 1520 it was pawned to Danish admiral Jens Holgersen Ulfstand who in 1499 had constructed nearby Glimmingehus. The property ceased to be a crown land.

In 1630, Palle Ulfsted sold the property to Danish nobleman Otte Marsvin, who constructed the present castle 1644–1648, naming it after his family. Marsvin is the Danish word for the porpoise and holm is a small island. Otte Marsvin's sister, Ellen Marsvin, was the "mother-in-law" (her daughter Kirsten Munk was a common law wife to the king) of the king Christian IV of Denmark, and the Marsvin family was one of Denmark's largest property owners.

Otte Marsvin constructed his castle on beech poles in a small lake. It is a four-storey, square structure. Two of the four corners, in the north east and the south west, are provided with five-storey towers. The castle was renovated thoroughly between 1782 and 1786 by count Erik Ruuth, and in 1856-1857 baron Jules Sjöblad hired Danish architect Ch. F. Zwingmann to restore the castle again. This last restoration gave the structure its current Dutch Renaissance (Christian IV)-style.

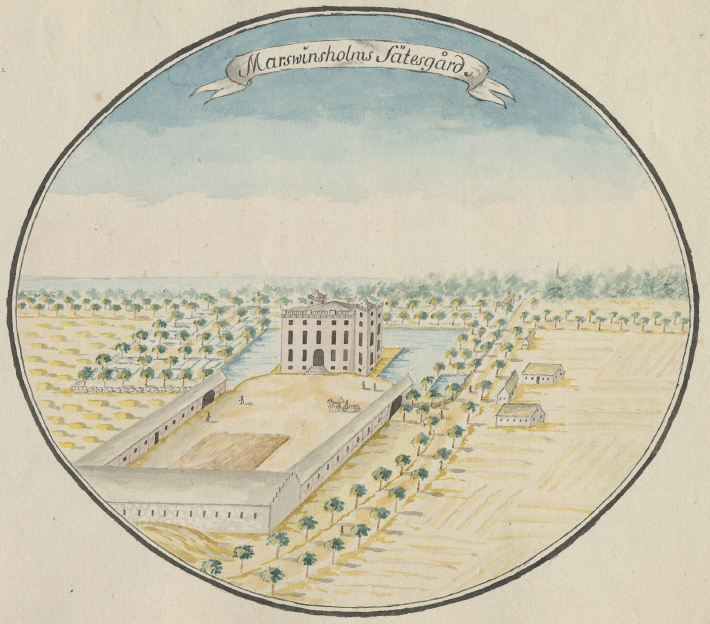
Castle and curtilage depicted as at 1780

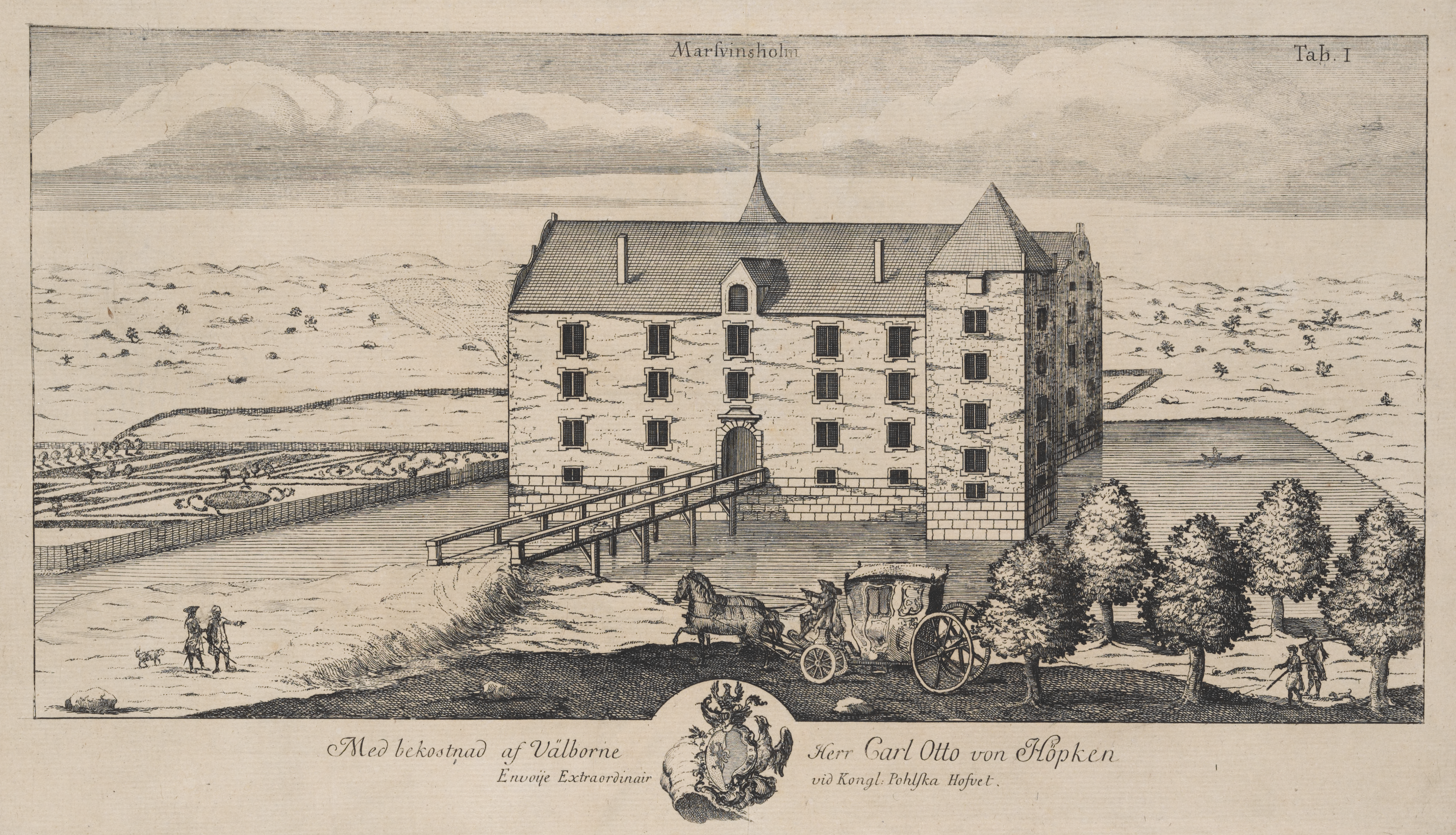
The castle as at 1680

Due to the Scanian War (1675-1679), the pro-Danish owner Holger Thott was stripped of the castle by the Swedish crown. It has since then - through inheritance and sale - belonged to the Swedish families von Königsmarck, de la Gardie, Sjöblad, Ruuth, Piper, Tornerhielm and Wachtmeister. Count Carl Wachtmeister sold the castle and the remaining land to baron Jules Stjernblad in 1854. The castle was handed down to his daughter, countess Ida Eherensvärd. Her children, Rutger, Louise and Madeleine Bennet owned it until 1910 when they sold it to Johannes Johannesen from Denmark. In 1938, he gave the property to his daughter, Anna Margrethe and her husband Jørgen Wendelboe-Larsen.

In 1978 their son, Erik Wendelboe-Larsen, sold the property to Bengt Iacobaeus, whose son, Tomas Iacobaeus, is the current owner of Marsvinsholm.
