= Viking runestones =

Category of inscription

Clickable map of the geographic distribution of the Viking runestones in southern Scandinavia (modern administrative borders and cities are shown)

The Viking runestones are runestones that mention Scandinavians who participated in Viking expeditions. This article treats the runestone that refer to people who took part in voyages abroad, in western Europe, and stones that mention men who were Viking warriors and/or died while travelling in the West. However, it is likely that all of them do not mention men who took part in pillaging. The inscriptions were all engraved in Old Norse with the Younger Futhark. The runestones are unevenly distributed in Scandinavia: Denmark has 250 runestones, Norway has 50 while Iceland has none. Sweden has as many as between 1,700 and 2,500 depending on definition. The Swedish district of Uppland has the highest concentration with as many as 1,196 inscriptions in stone, whereas Södermanland is second with 391.

The largest group consists of 30 stones that mention England, and they are treated separately in the article England runestones. The runestones that talk of voyages to eastern Europe, the Byzantine Empire and the Middle East are treated separately in the article Varangian runestones and its subarticles.

The most notable of the Viking runestones is the Kjula Runestone in Södermanland, Sweden, and it contains a poem in Old Norse in the metre fornyrðislag that refers to the extensive warfare of a man called "Spear":

saʀ vestarla um vaʀit hafði, borg um brutna i ok um barða; færð han karsaʀ kunni allaʀ.	who had been in the west, broken down and fought in townships. He knew all the journey's fortresses.

Below follows a presentation of the runestones based on the Rundata project. The transcriptions into Old Norse are in the Swedish and Danish dialect to facilitate comparison with the inscriptions, while the English translation provided by Rundata gives the names in the de facto standard dialect (the Icelandic and Norwegian dialect):

== Sweden ==
=== Uppland ===
==== U 349 ====
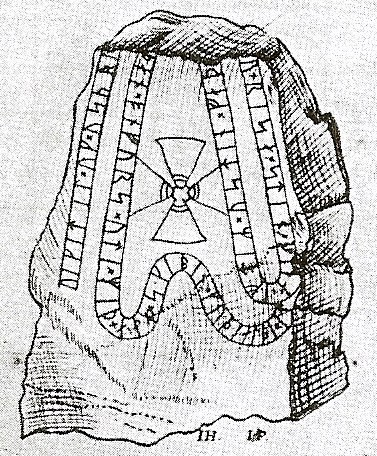
Runestone U 349 in a 17th-century drawing.

This runestone located at Odenslunda was documented during the Swedish runestone surveys in the 17th century, but has since disappeared. It is classified as being carved in runestone style RAK. This is considered to be the oldest style, and is used for inscriptions with runic text bands that have straight ends without any attached serpent or beast heads.

[uikitil × uk × usur -...u × risa × stin × þina * iftiʀ × ustin × faþ... … ...þan × on furs × uti × miþ × ala × skibin × kuþ × ialbi × (a)t]
Vikætill {} ok {} Ossurr [let]u {} ræisa {} stæin {} þenna {} æftiʀ {} Øystæin, {} fað[ur] … [go]ðan. {} Hann fors {} uti {} með {} alla {} skipan. {} Guð {} hialpi {} and.
"Véketill and Ôzurr had this stone raised in memory of Eysteinn, … good father. He perished abroad with all the seamen. May God help (his) spirit."

==== U 363 ====
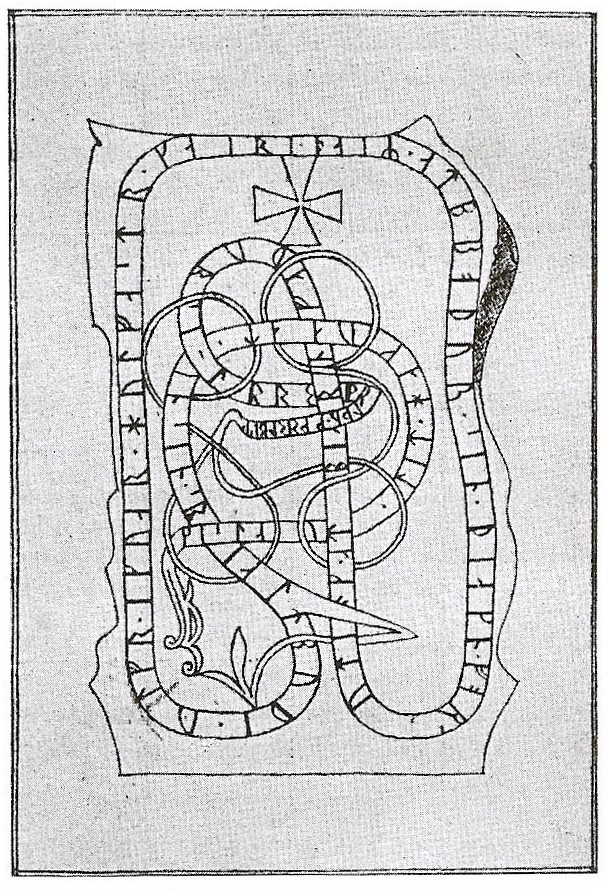
Runestone U 363 in a 17th-century drawing.

This runestone was a boulder which was located at Gådersta, but it has disappeared. It was possibly in runestone style Pr4, which is also known as Urnes style. In this style the text bands end in serpent or beast heads depicted in profile.

[kislauk * lit * hakua * at sun sin * sbialtbuþi * ulfr * ikuar * hulfastr * kairi * þaiʀ * at broþur * sin * þiakn * fors * uti ok * at biarn faþur sin bro kirþu * ku=þ hialbi silu]
Gislaug {} let {} haggva {} at sun sinn, {} Spiallbuði, {} Ulfʀ, {} Ingvarr, {} Holmfastr, {} Gæiʀi, {} þæiʀ {} at broður {} sinn {} Þiagn, {} fors {} uti, ok {} at Biorn, faður sinn. Bro gærðu. {} Guð hialpi salu.
"Gíslaug had (this) cut in memory of her son; Spjallboði, Ulfr, Ingvarr, Holmfastr, Geiri, they made the bridge in memory of their brother Þegn, (who) perished abroad, and in memory of Bjôrn, their father. May God help (their) souls."

==== U 504 ====
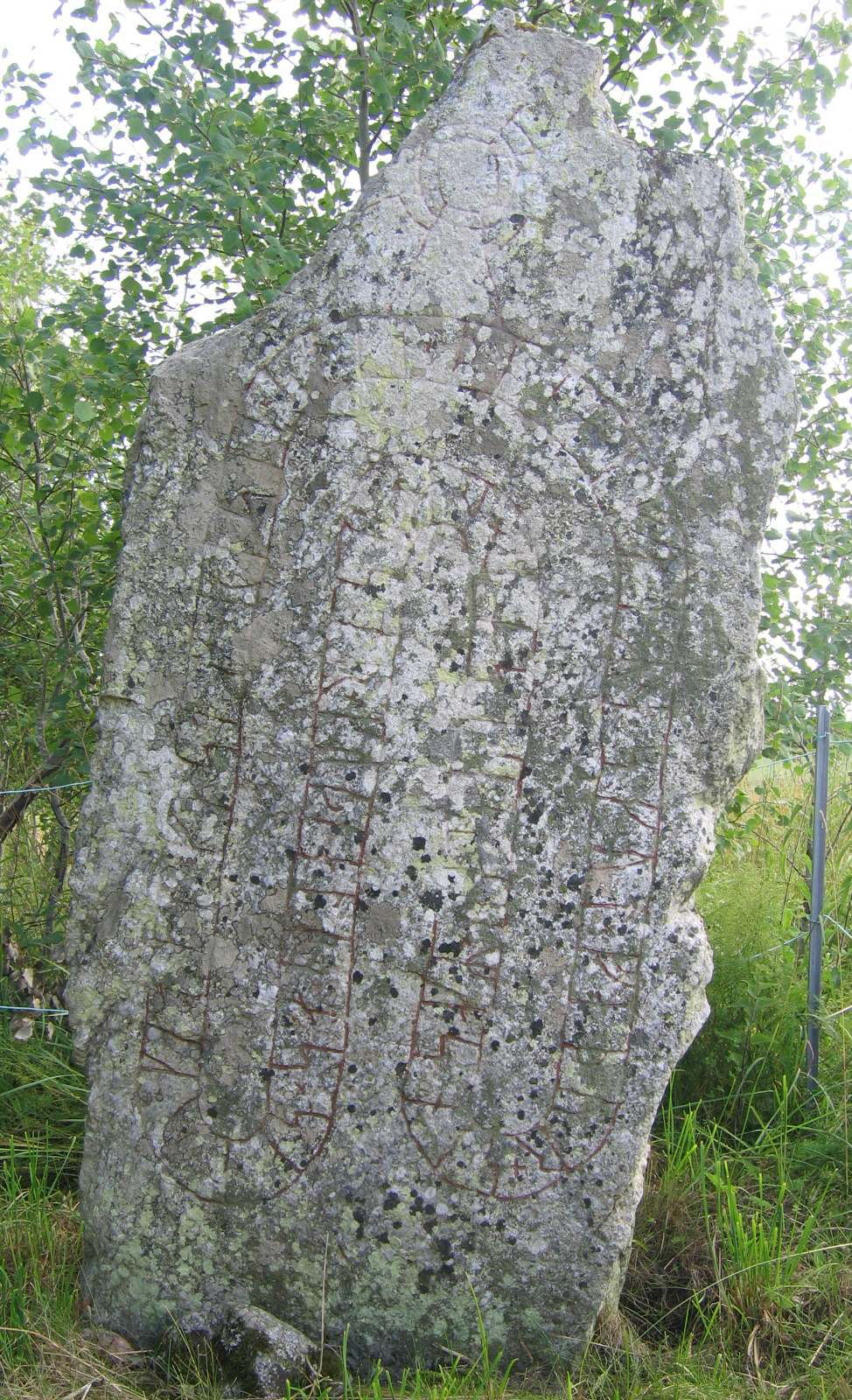
The rune stone U 504.

This runestone is an early inscription carved in runestone style RAK with a cross above the text bands. It is located in Ubby and it was raised in memory of a father. This man had participated in Viking expeditions both in the west and in the east.

+ kitil×fastr × risti × stin + þina × iftiʀ × askut × faþur + sin × saʀ × uas × uistr × uk × ustr + kuþ ialbi × as × salu
{} Kætilfastr {} ræisti {} stæin {} þenna {} æftiʀ {} Asgaut, {} faður {} sinn. {} Saʀ {} vas {} vestr {} ok {} austr. {} Guð hialpi {} hans {} salu.
"Ketilfastr raised this stone in memory of Ásgautr, his father. He was in the west and in the east. May God help his soul."

==== U 611 ====
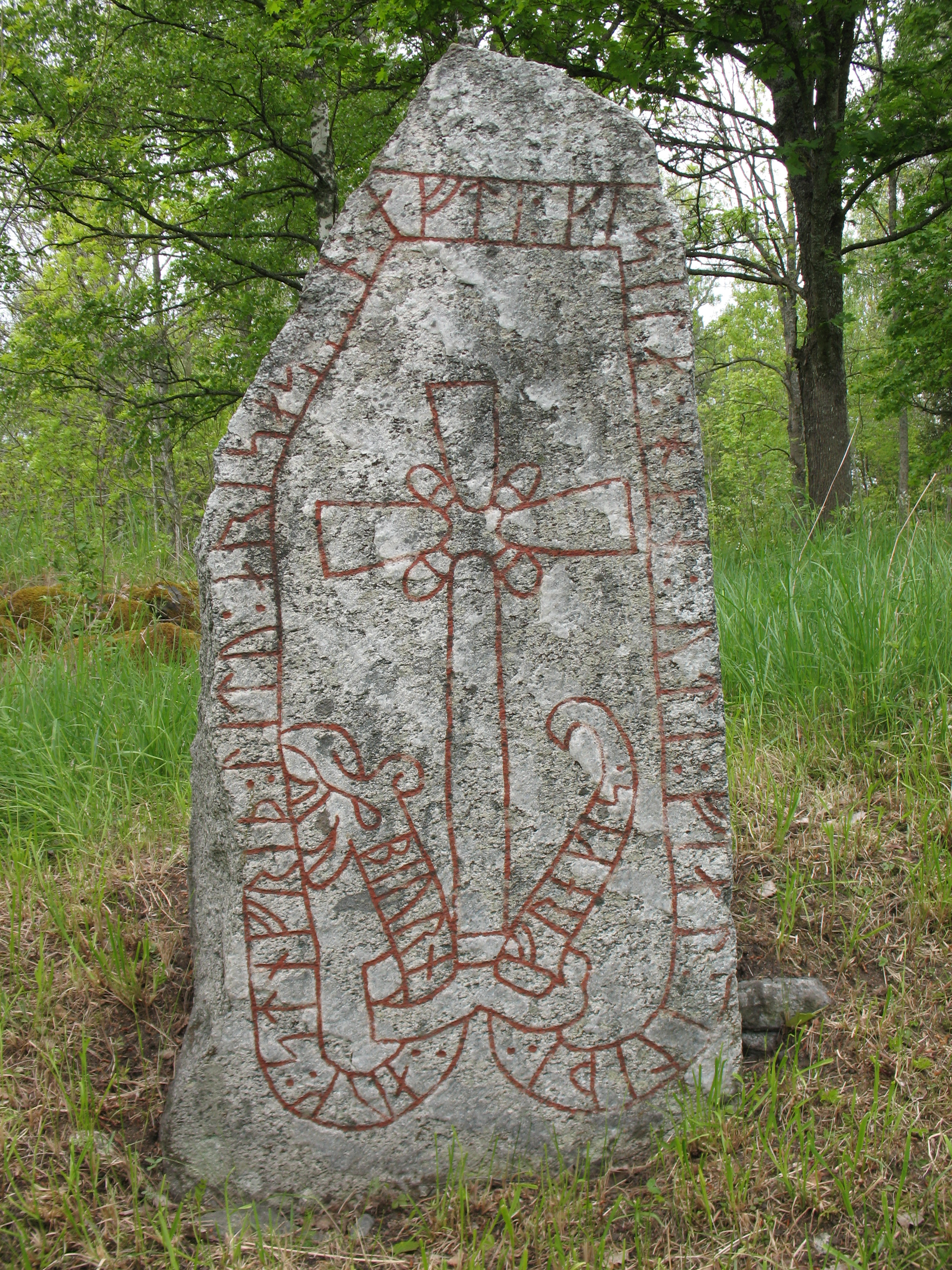
Runestone U 611.

This runestone carved in runestone style Pr1 is located at Tibble. It appears to be raised in memory of a man who died in the retinue of the Viking chieftain Freygeirr. Pr 1 is also known as Ringerike style, and this classification is used for inscriptions which depicts the serpent heads attached to the runic text bands in profile, but the serpents or beasts are not as elongated and stylized as in the Urnes style.

biurn : auk : stnfriþ : litu : arisa s--n : afti : kisila : han : uti : fial : i liþi : frekis *
Biorn {} ok {} Stæinfrið {} letu {} ræisa s[tæi]n {} æftiʀ {} Gisla. {} Hann {} uti {} fioll {} i liði {} Frøygæiʀs(?). {}
"Bjôrn and Steinfríðr had the stone raised in memory of Gísli. He fell abroad in Freygeirr's(?) retinue."

==== U 668 ====
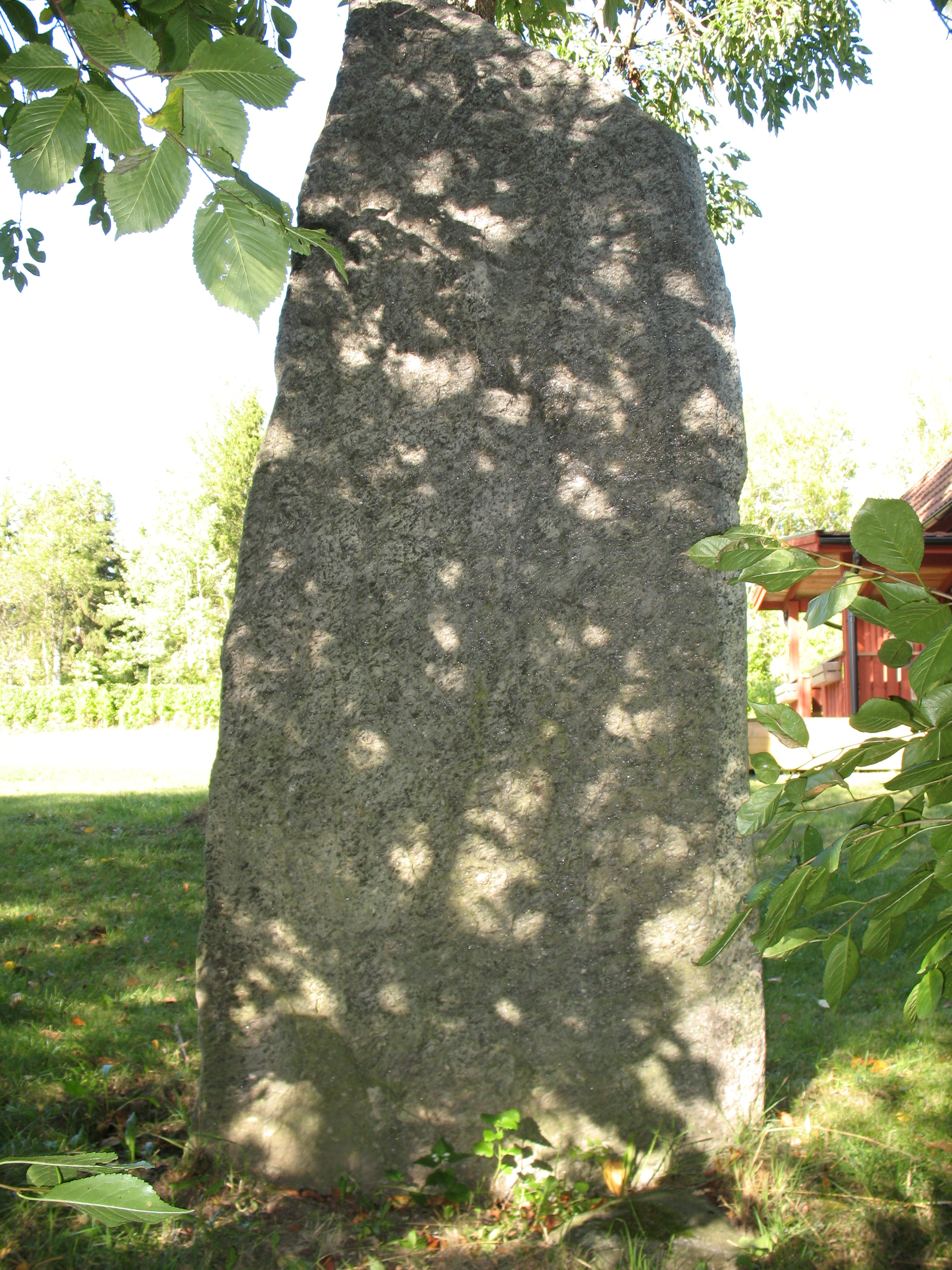
The runestone U 668.

This runestone is found in Kolsta (also spelled Kålsta). In the 17th century this stone was found by one of Johannes Bureus' assistants and it was part of the wall of a manor house. After having been lost for 100 years it was rediscovered in the mid-19th century.

The stone is of high notability because it was raised in memory of one of the members of the Dano-English kings' personal guard, the Þingalið, consisting of elite warriors who mostly came from Scandinavia. This elite unit existed between 1016 and 1066. Another runestone raised in memory of a man who died in the same retinue is found in Södermanland, the Råby Runestone.

The Kolsta runestone is carved in runestone style Pr3, and it is not older than the mid-11th century as indicated by the use of dotted runes and the use of the ansuz rune for the o phoneme.

' sterkar * auk ' hioruarþr ' letu * reisa * þensa * stein at ' faþur sin keir(a) ' sum ' uestr ' sat ' i þikaliþi * kuþ hialbi salu
{} Stærkarr {} ok {} Hiorvarðr {} letu {} ræisa {} þennsa {} stæin at {} faður sinn Gæiʀa, {} sum {} vestr {} sat {} i þingaliði. {} Guð hialpi salu.
"Styrkárr and Hjôrvarðr had this stone raised in memory of their father Geiri, who sat in the Assembly's retinue in the west. May God help (his) soul."

=== Södermanland ===
==== Sö 14 ====
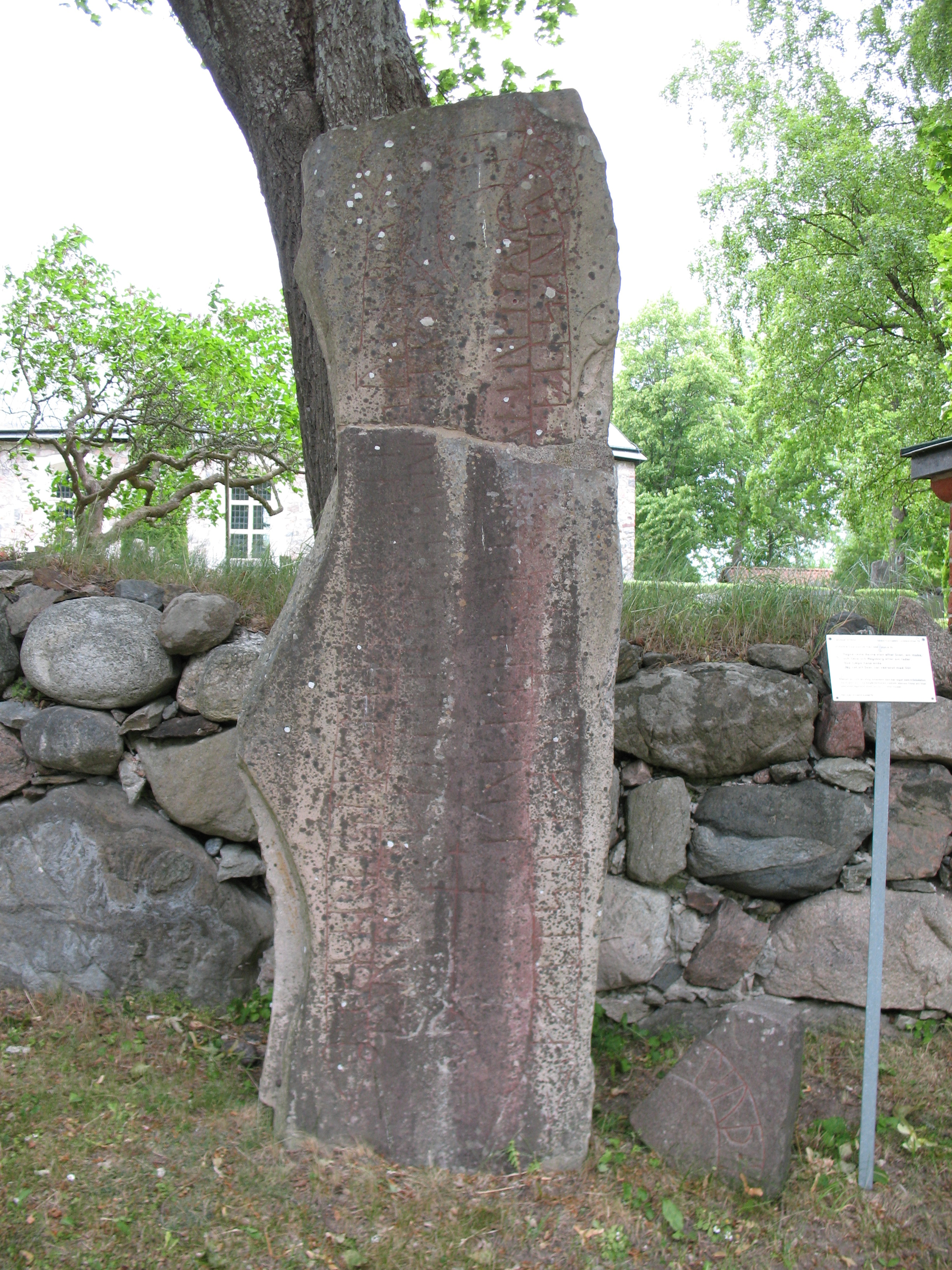
Sö 14.

This runestone is found at the church of Gåsinge. It is carved in runestone style Fp, which is the classification for text bands with attached serpent or beast heads depicted as seen from above. It was raised by two women in memory of their husband and father. He took part in an expedition in the west, possibly with Canute the Great.

rakna * raisti * stain * þansi * at * suin * buta * sit * auk * sifa * auk * r-knburk * at * sit * faþur * kuþ * hil[b]i * at * [hat]s * uit * iak * þet * uaʀ * sui- * uestr * miþ * kuti
Ragna {} ræisti {} stæin {} þannsi {} at {} Svæin, {} bonda {} sinn, {} ok {} Sæfa {} ok {} R[a]gnborg {} at {} sinn {} faður. {} Guð {} hialpi {} and {} hans. {} Væit {} iak, {} þæt {} vaʀ {} Svæi[nn] {} vestr {} með {} Gauti/Knuti.
"Ragna raised this stone in memory of Sveinn, her husbandman, and Sæfa and Ragnbjôrg in memory of their father. May God help his spirit. I know that Sveinn was in the west with Gautr/Knútr."

==== Sö 53 ====
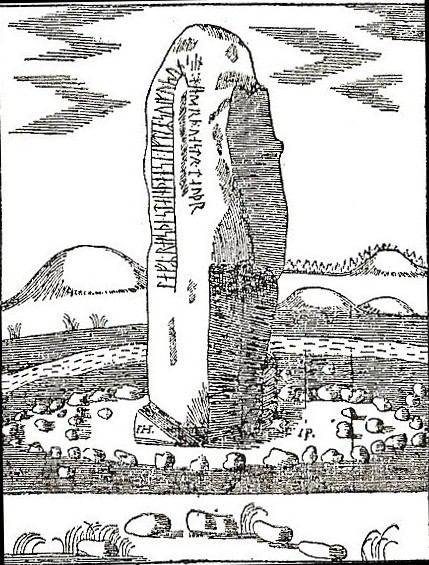
17th century drawing by Johan Peringskiöld.

This runestone was documented during the Swedish surveys of runestones in the 17th century as being located in Valstad. Part of the stone was later found in a wall of a shed at a courtyard and another below a cottage. The courtyard along with several nearby houses were later destroyed in 1880. The stone is now considered to be lost. It is classified as possibly being in runestone style RAK and was raised in memory of a son who died in the west.

[lafʀ * raisþi * stain * þansi : iftiʀ * sulfu * sun sin : han uarþ : uastr * tauþr]
Olafʀ {} ræisþi {} stæin {} þannsi {} æftiʀ {} Sylfu/Solfu, {} sun sinn. {} Hann varð {} vestr {} dauðr.
"Ólafr raised this stone in memory of Sylfa/Solfa, his son. He died in the west."

==== Sö 62 ====
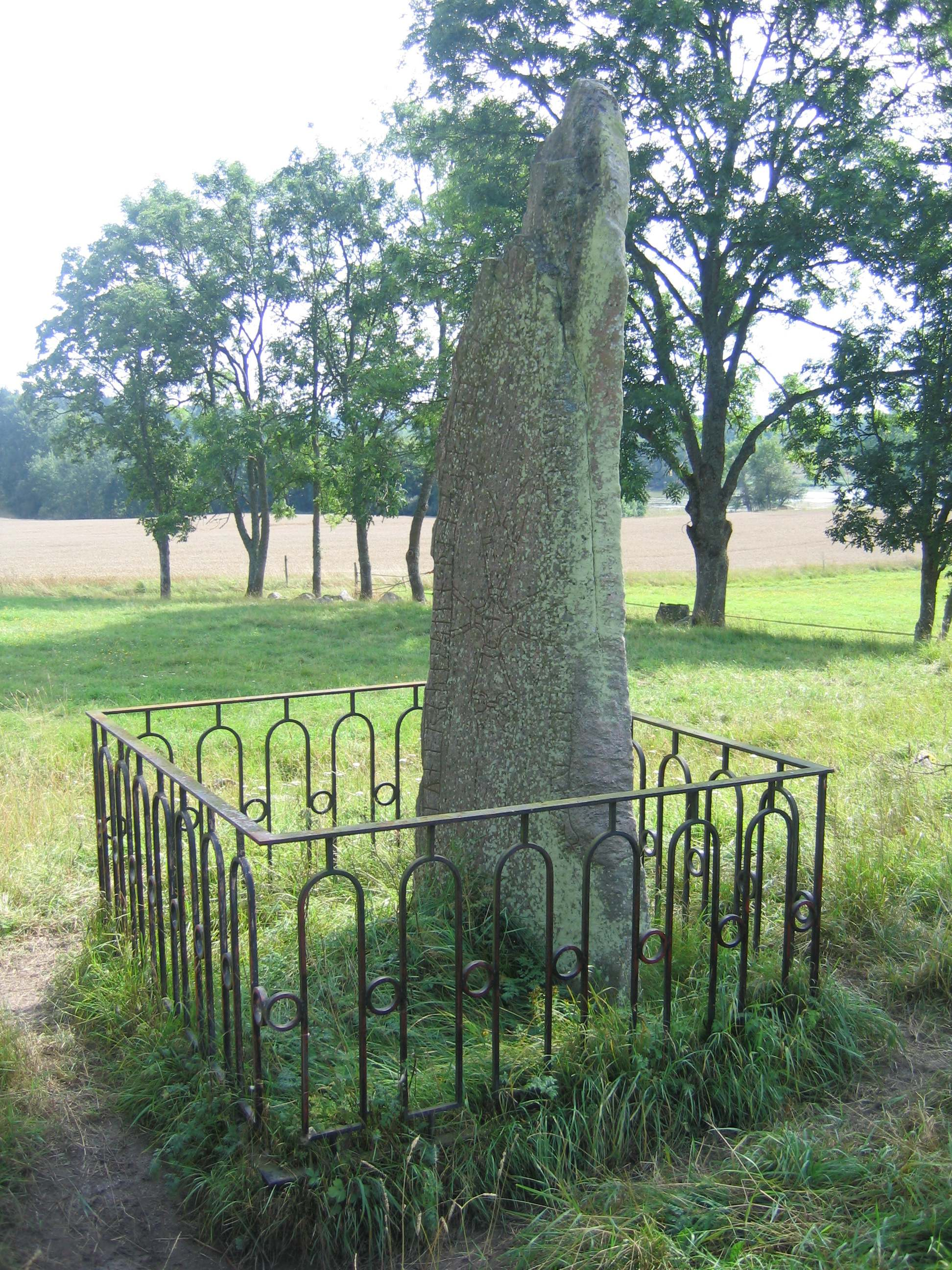
Sö 62.

This runestone is found at Hässlö, today Hässle, and is carved in runestone style Pr1. It was raised in memory of a son who died on the western route.

kuni : rasti stan : þansi : a ragna : sun san : kuþan : i uak : uaþ : taþʀ uastr
Gunni {} ræisti stæin {} þannsi {} at Ragna, {} sun sinn {} goðan, {} i veg {} varð {} dauðr vestr.
"Gunni raised this stone in memory of Ragni, his good son; (he) died on the western route."

==== Sö 106 ====
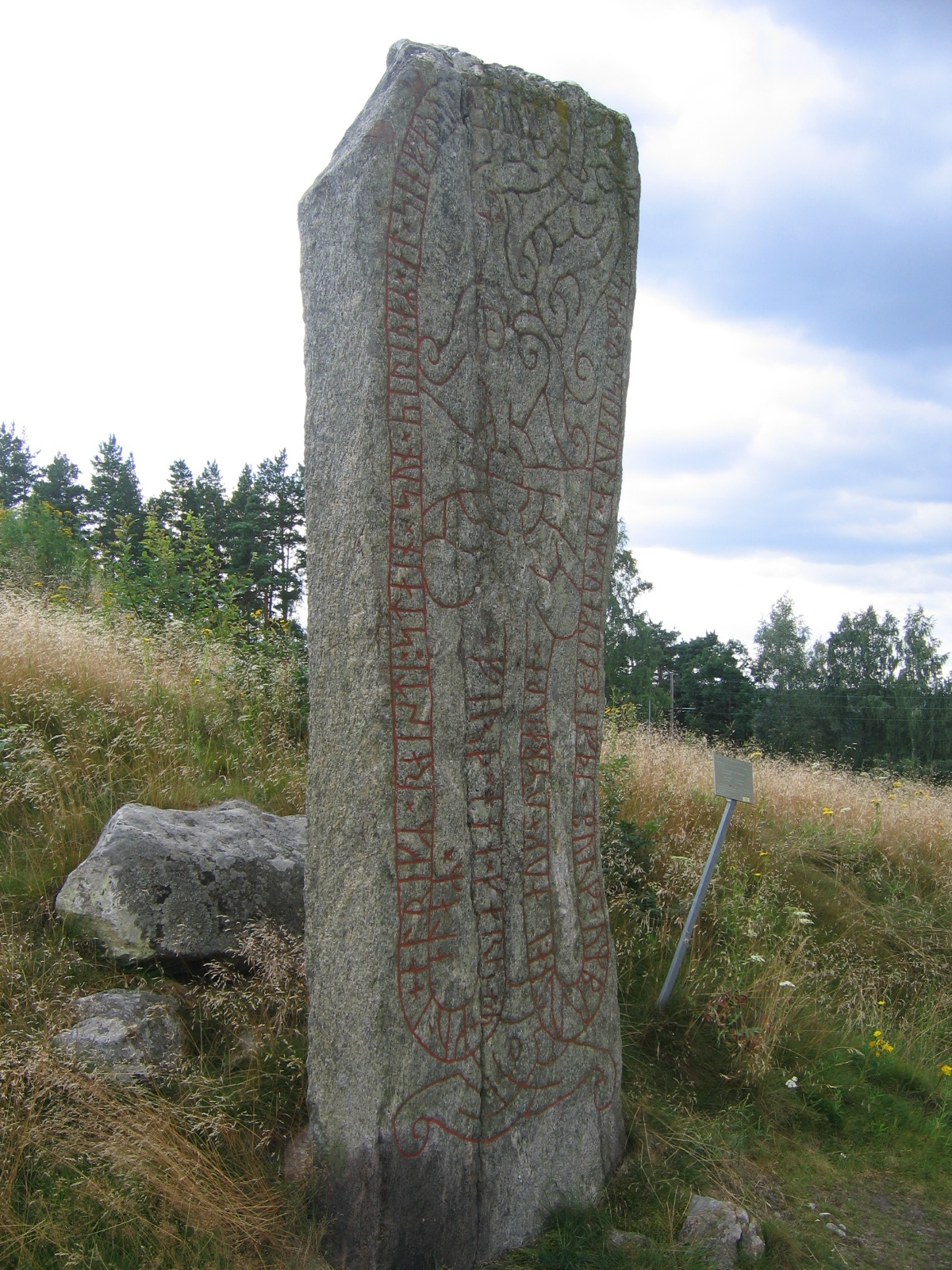
Sö 106.

The Kjula Runestone is a famous runestone that is carved in runestone style Pr1. It is located in Kjula at the old road between Eskilstuna and Strängnäs, which was also the location for the local assembly.

It tells of a man called Spjót ("spear") who had taken part in extensive warfare in western Europe. It is held to have been raised by the same aristocratic family as the Ramsund carving nearby and the Bro Runestone in Uppland. Several Scandinavian authorities such as Sophus Bugge, Erik Brate, and Elias Wessén have discussed the runestone and how extensive the warfare of Spjót could have been. Spjót, meaning "Spear", is a unique name and it may have been a name he earned as a warrior.

The text uses the term vestarla for "in the west" without specifying a location. Four other Viking runestones similarly use this term, Sö 137, Sö 164, Sö 173, and Sm 51.

alrikʀ ¤ raisti ¤ stain × sun × siriþaʀ × at × sin faþur × sbiut ×× saʀ × uisitaula × um × uaʀit : hafþi × burg × um brutna : i : auk × um barþa +× firþ × han × kar(s)aʀ + kuni + alaʀ ×
Alrikʀ {} ræisti {} stæin, {} sunn {} Sigriðaʀ, {} at {} sinn faður {} Spiut, {} saʀ {} vestarla {} um {} vaʀit {} hafði, {} borg {} um brutna {} i {} ok {} um barða, {} færð {} hann {} karsaʀ {} kunni {} allaʀ. {}
"Alríkr, Sigríðr's son, raised the stone in memory of his father Spjót, who had been in the west, broken down and fought in townships. He knew all the journey's fortresses."

==== Sö 137 ====
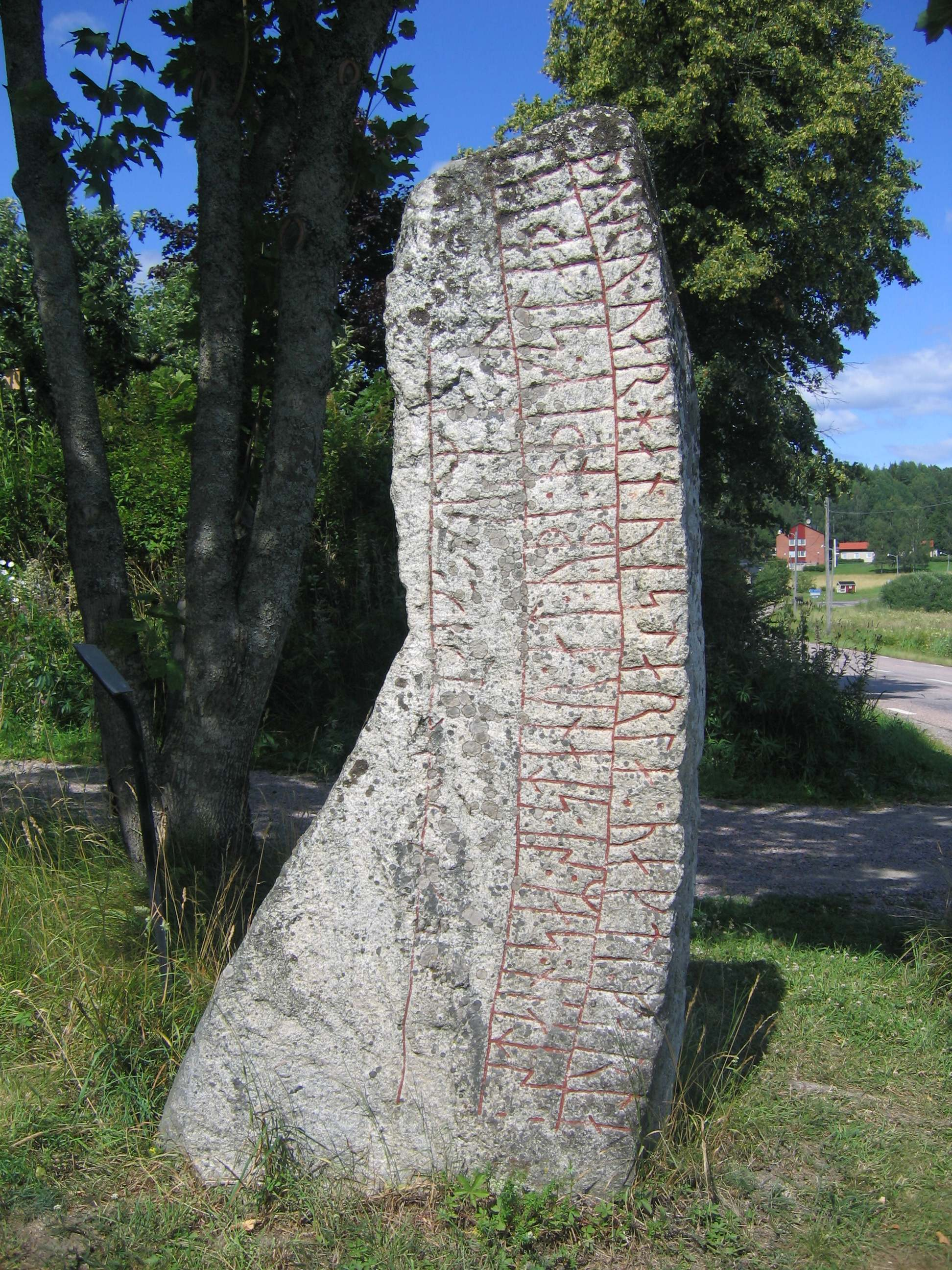
Side B of Sö 137.

This is one of the runestones at Aspa and is classified as being carved in runestone style RAK. It was engraved with both long-branch runes and staveless runes. In the last row all the words but the last one were written with staveless runes.

þura : raisþi : stin : þ--si at : ubi : buanti : sin
Þora {} ræisþi {} stæin {} þ[ann]si at {} Øpi, {} boanda {} sinn.
"Þóra raised this stone in memory of Œpir, her husbandman."

: stain : saʀ:si : stanr : at : ybi : o þik*staþi : at ¶ : þuru : uar : han : uestarla : uakti : karla ¶ [sa þar] * sunr þaþ * raknasuatau(k)i(f)maʀ[sua]
{} Stæinn {} saʀsi {} standr {} at {} Øpi {} a þingstaði {} at {} {} Þoru {} ver. {} Hann {} vestarla {} væknti(?) {} karla, {} sa þaʀ {} sunʀ það. {} …
"This stone stands in memory of Œpir, on the Assembly-place in memory of Þóra's husband. He armed(?) (his) men in the west. The son saw this there ..."

==== Sö 159 ====
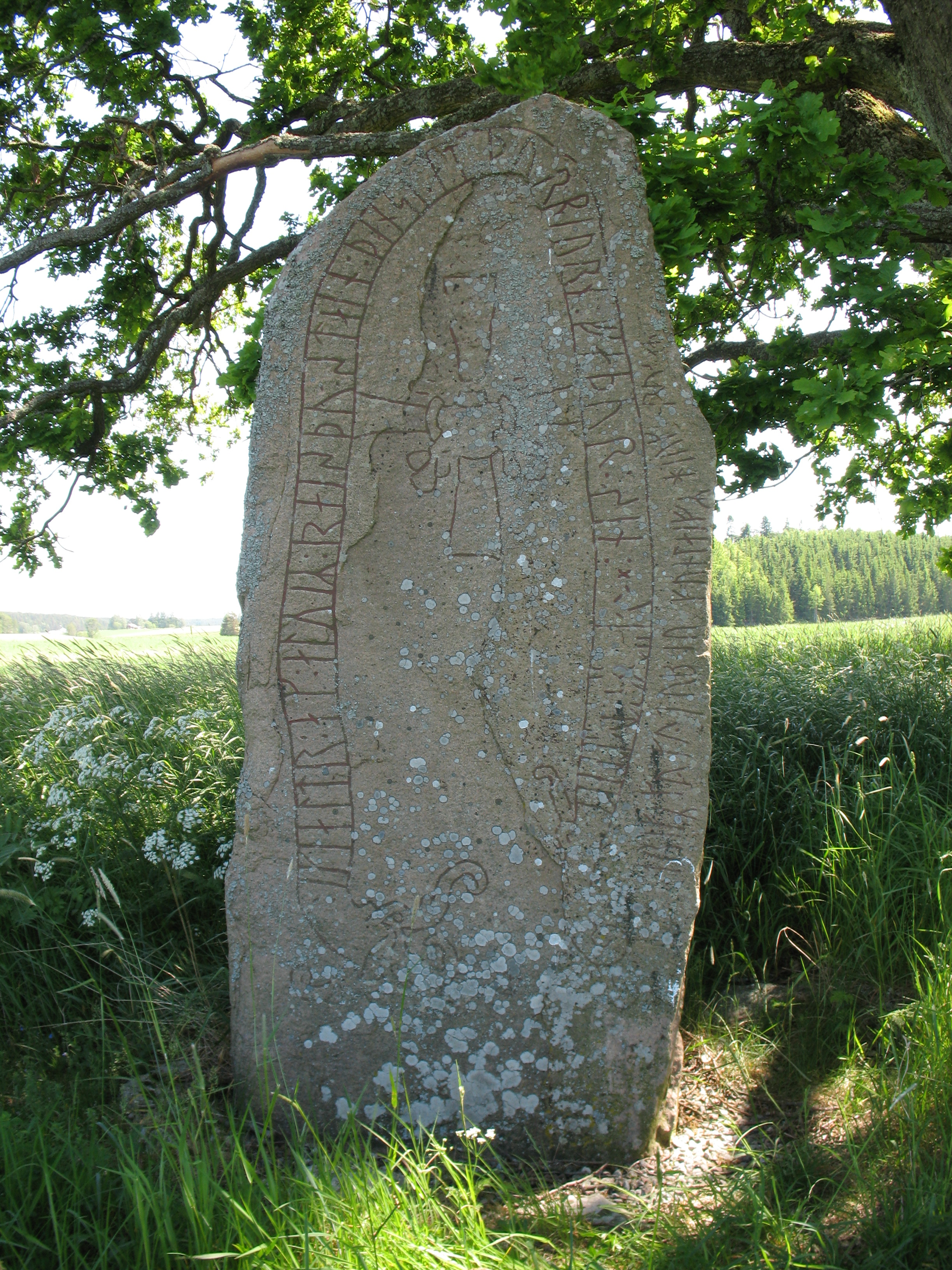
Sö 159.

This runestone is tentatively categorized as being in runestone style RAK, and is located in Österberga. It has both long-branch runes and staveless runes. It was raised in memory of a father who had been in the west for a long time.

: ikialtr : ak : aluiʀ : raisþu : stain : þansi : at : þurbiurn : faþur : sin : han uaistr hafʀ uf uaʀit leki rorikʀ * kumytr biu * kunlaifʀ hiuku runaʀ
{} Ingialdr {} ok {} Alveʀ/Ølveʀ {} ræisþu {} stæin {} þannsi {} at {} Þorbiorn, {} faður {} sinn. {} Hann vestr hafʀ of vaʀit længi. Hrøʀikʀ(?), {} Guðmundr, <biu>, {} Gunnlæifʀ hiuggu runaʀ.
"Ingjaldr and Ôlvir raised this stone in memory of Þorbjôrn, their father. He has been long in the west. Hrœríkr(?), Guðmundr, <biu> (and) Gunnleifr cut the runes."

==== Sö 164 ====
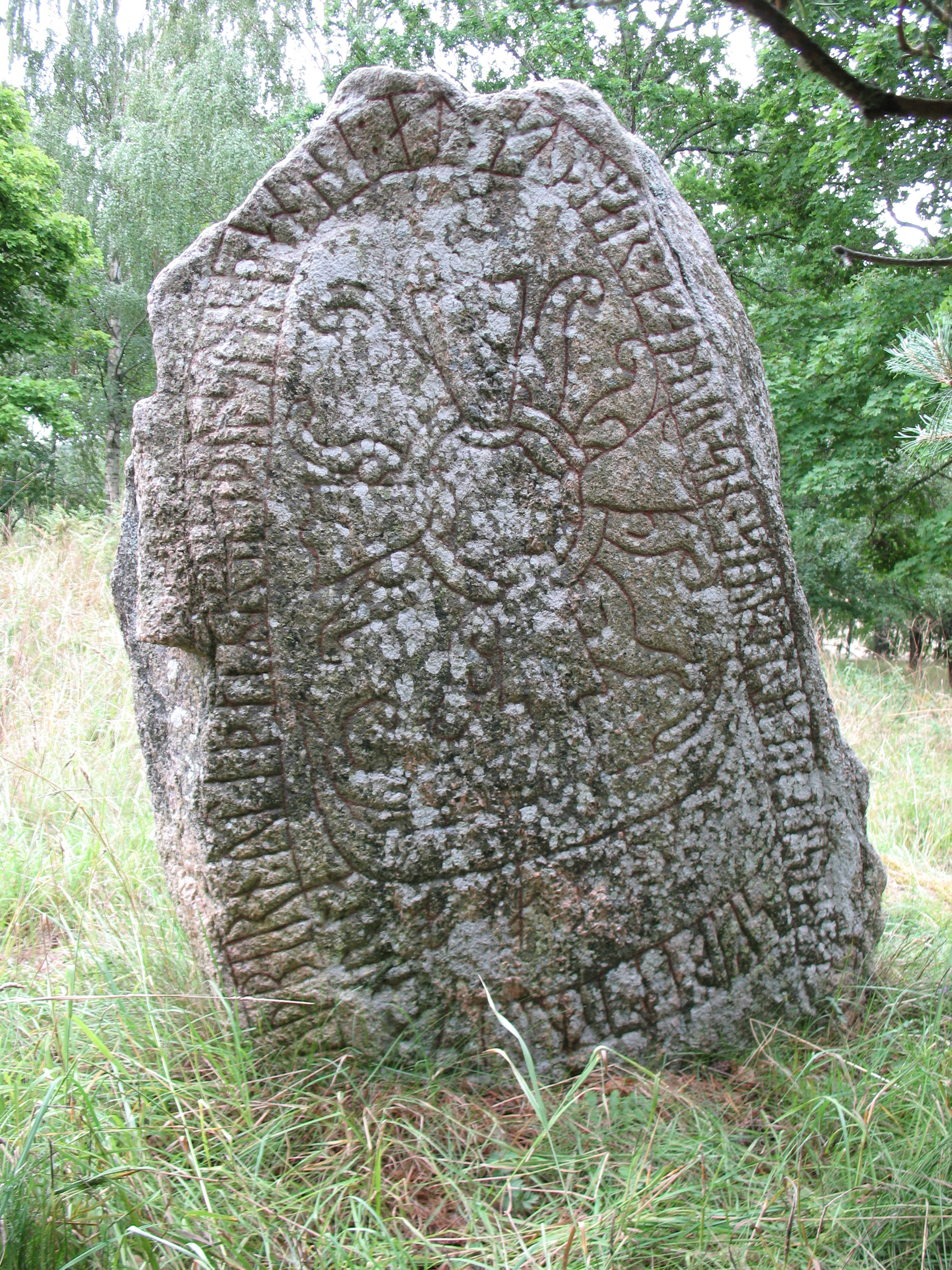
Sö 164.

This runestone is found at Spånga and it sports not only long-branch runes, but also cipher runes made of both short-twig runes and staveless runes. The ornamentation is a ship where the mast is an artful cross. It is the only runestone with both text and iconography that refer to a ship. It was raised in memory of a man who took part in an expedition to the west where he was buried, and refers to him heroically in alliterative verse or prose. This runestone is attributed to a runemaster named Traen.

kuþbirn : uti : þaiʀ r(a)isþu : stan þansi : at : kuþmar : f(a)þur : sin : stuþ : triki:l(a) : i * stafn skibi : likʀ uistarla uf huln sar tu :
Guðbiorn, {} Oddi, {} þæiʀ ræisþu {} stæin þannsi {} at {} Guðmar, {} faður {} sinn. {} Stoð {} drængila {} i {} stafn skipi, {} liggʀ vestarla of hulinn(?), saʀ do. {}
"Guðbjôrn (and) Oddi, they raised this stone in memory of Guðmarr, their father. He who died stood valiantly in the staff of the ship; (now) lies inhumed in the west."

==== Sö 173 ====
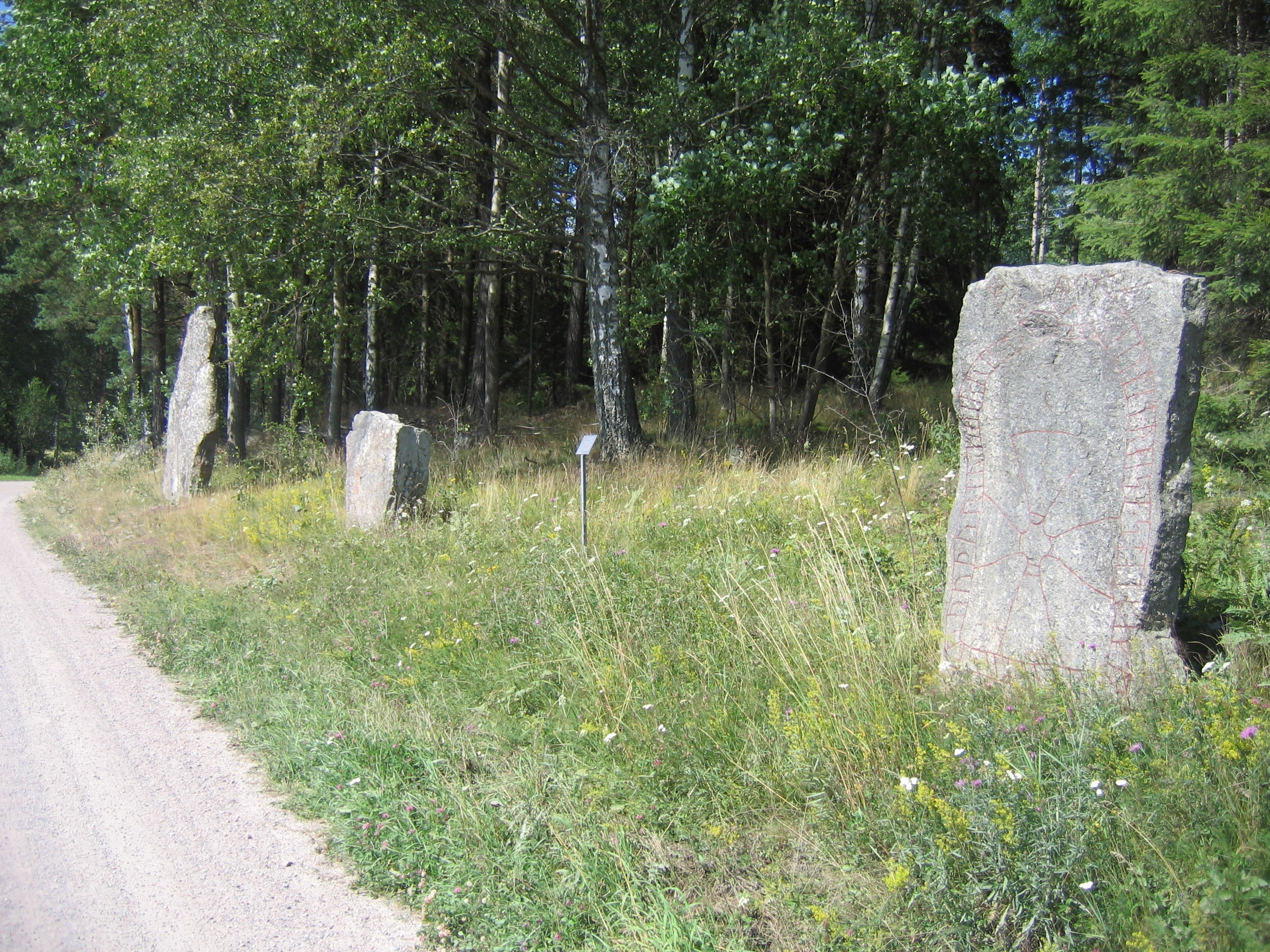
The three raised stones at Tystberga.

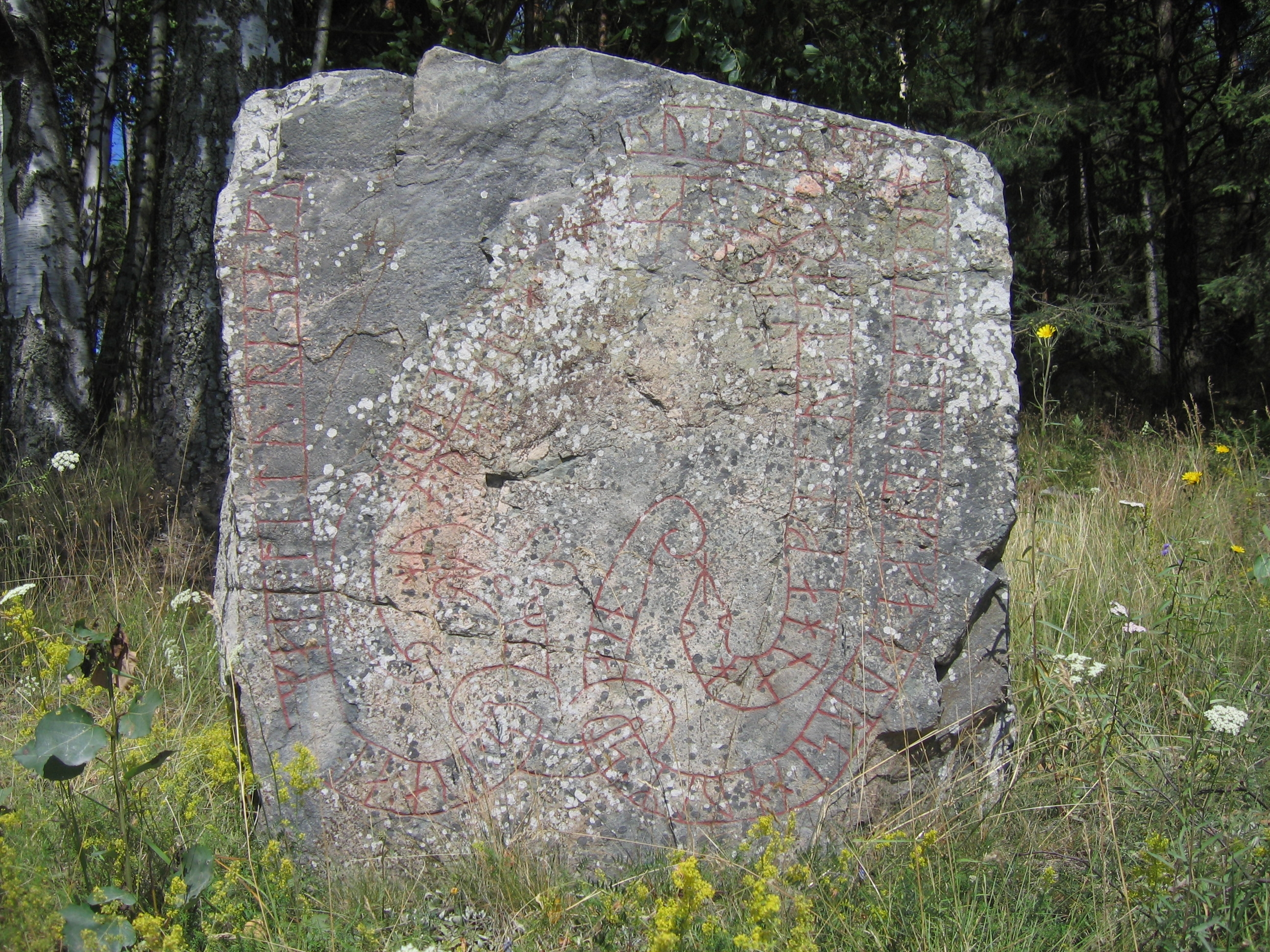
The runestone Sö 173.

In the village of Tystberga there are three raised stones. Two of them are runestones called Sö 173 and Sö 374, of which the last one has a cross. Both inscriptions are from the 11th century and tell of the same family. They probably refer to Viking expeditions both westwards and eastwards. Sö 173 is one of only two (the other one is U 802) known runestones whose ornamentation contain runic animal heads in both bird perspective (Fp) and profile perspective (Pr).

The location was first described by Lukas Gabb during the nationwide revision of pre-historic monuments that took place in the 17th century. In a paddock at the state owned homestead of Tystberga there was a flat stone lying with runes and next to it there was another flat stone that was leaning. In addition, there was a large square stone surrounded with rows of smaller stones, which Gadd described as a "fairly large cemetery". Not far from the stones, there were also two giant passage graves, about 20 paces long.

There is a depiction of the cross-less stone from the 17th century, made by Johan Hadorph and Johan Peringskiöld. This depiction has helped scholars reconstruct the parts that are damaged today. The runestone was raised anew by Richard Dybeck in 1864. In 1936, Ivar Schnell examined the stone, and he noted that there was a large stone next to it. When this stone was raised, they discovered that it was also a runestone, and it was probably the one that had been previously described by Lukas Gadd as the "square stone". In the vicinity, Schnell found a destroyed stone without runes which probably was the leaning stone described by Gadd. Since they would hinder agriculture, the three stones were re-erected at a distance of 60 metres, at the side of the road. The stone circle and the other monuments described by Gadd could not be found anymore.

Regarding the names of the sponsors of the stone, the runes mani can be interpreted in two ways, since runic texts never repeat two runes consecutively. One possibility is that it refers to Máni, the moon, and the other alternative is the male name Manni which is derived from maðr ("man"). The runes mus:kia are more challenging and the older interpretation that it was Mus-Gea is nowadays rejected. It is probably a nominalization of myskia which means "darken" as during sunset, and one scholar has suggested that it could mean "sunset" and "twilight" and refer to e.g. a hair colour. A second theory is that the name refers to the animal bat. It is also disputed whether it is a man's name or a woman's name, but most scholars think that it refers to a woman. The name Myskia appears in a second runic inscription, Sö 13 from Gatstugan, and it may refer to the same person. The inscription echos the m-runes from the sponsors' names in the shape of the tongues of the two serpents.

The last part of the cross-less inscription is both unusual and partly problematic. The word ystarla could without context be interpreted as both "westwards" and "eastwards", but since an austarla appears later in the inscription, it is agreed that ystarla means "westwards". It is unusual, but not unique, that the y-rune represents the v phoneme. An additional reason for this interpretation is the fact that it would allow the last part of the inscription to be interpreted as a poem in the meter fornyrðislag. This would explain the use of the rune since vestarla permits alliteration with um vaʀit. It is not known whether he refers to Hróðgeirr (Roger) or Holmsteinn, but most think that it is Holmsteinn who had been westwards. The plural ending -u in the verb form dou shows that both Hróðgeirr and Holmsteinn died in the Ingvar expedition.

mus:kia : a(u)[k :] (m)an(i) : litu : rasa : ku[(m)(l) : þausi : at : b]ruþur * (s)in : hr(u)þkaiʀ * auk : faþur sin hulm:stain *
Myskia {} ok {} Manni/Mani {} letu {} ræisa {} kumbl {} þausi {} at {} broður {} sinn {} Hroðgæiʀ {} ok {} faður sinn Holmstæin. {}
"Myskja and Manni/Máni had these monuments raised in memory of their brother Hróðgeirr and their father Holmsteinn."

* han hafþi * ystarla u(m) : uaʀit * lenki : tuu : a:ustarla : meþ : inkuari
{} Hann hafði {} vestarla um {} vaʀit {} længi, {} dou {} austarla {} með {} Ingvari.
"He had long been in the west; died in the east with Ingvarr."

==== Sö 217 ====
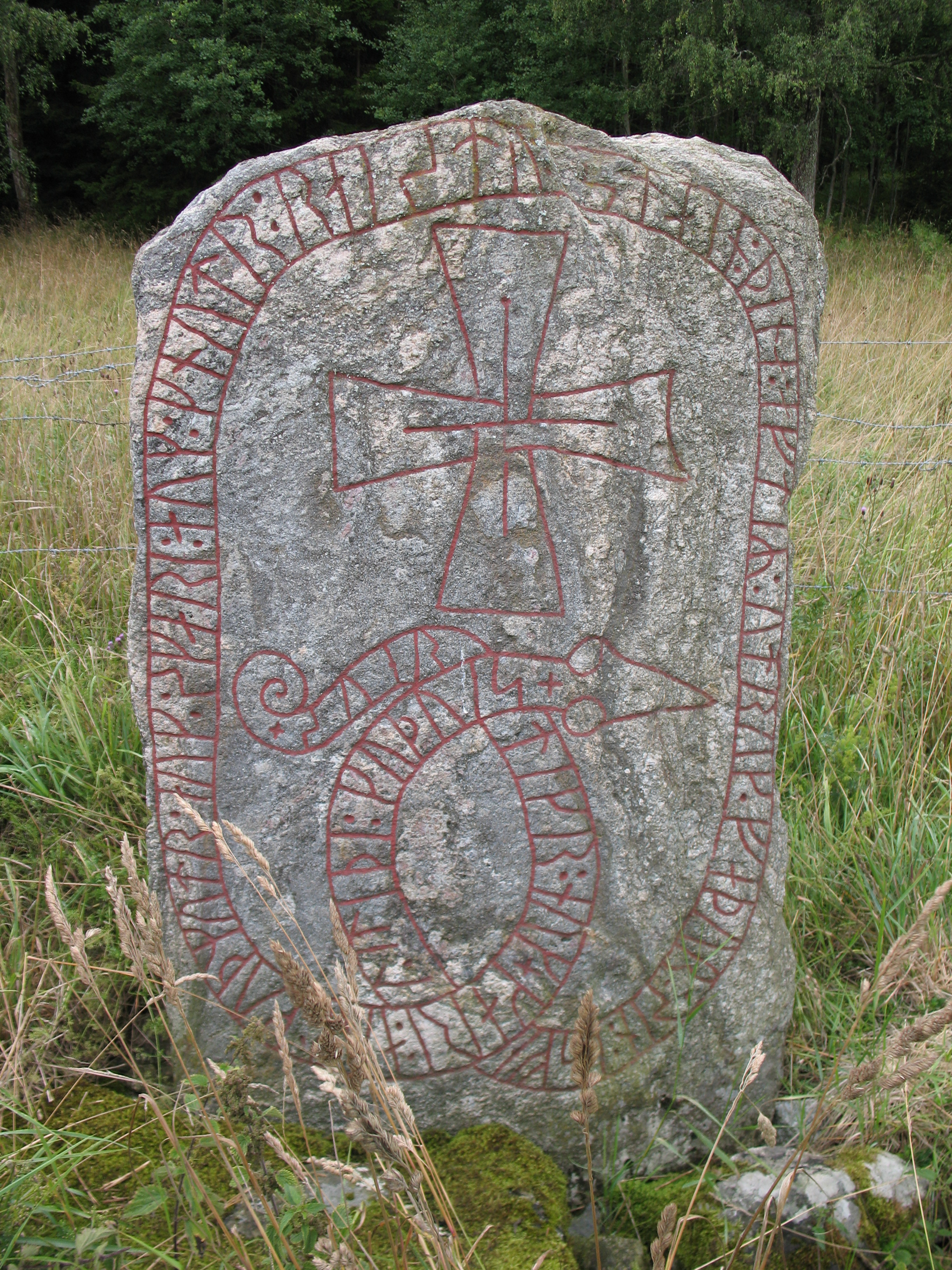
Sö 217.

This runestone in runestone style Fp is located in Sorunda. It is raised in memory of a father who died in a war expedition led by a commander named Guðvé. Erik Brate argues that it was the same expedition as the one mentioned on the Grinda Runestone and where the targets are reported to have been England and Saxony.

+ suertikr : nuk + kari : auk : kuþmutr : auk : skari : auk : knutr : raistu : stain : þena : aftiʀ : utruk * faþur : sin : is fel * i liþi : kuþuis +
{} Sværtingʀ {} ok {} Kari {} ok {} Guðmundr {} ok {} Skari {} ok {} Knutr {} ræistu {} stæin {} þenna {} æftiʀ {} Otrygg, {} faður {} sinn, {} es fell {} i liði {} Guðvis. {}
"Svertingr and Kári and Guðmundr and Skári and Knútr raised this stone in memory of Ótryggr, their father, who fell in Guðvé's retinue."

==== Sö 260 ====
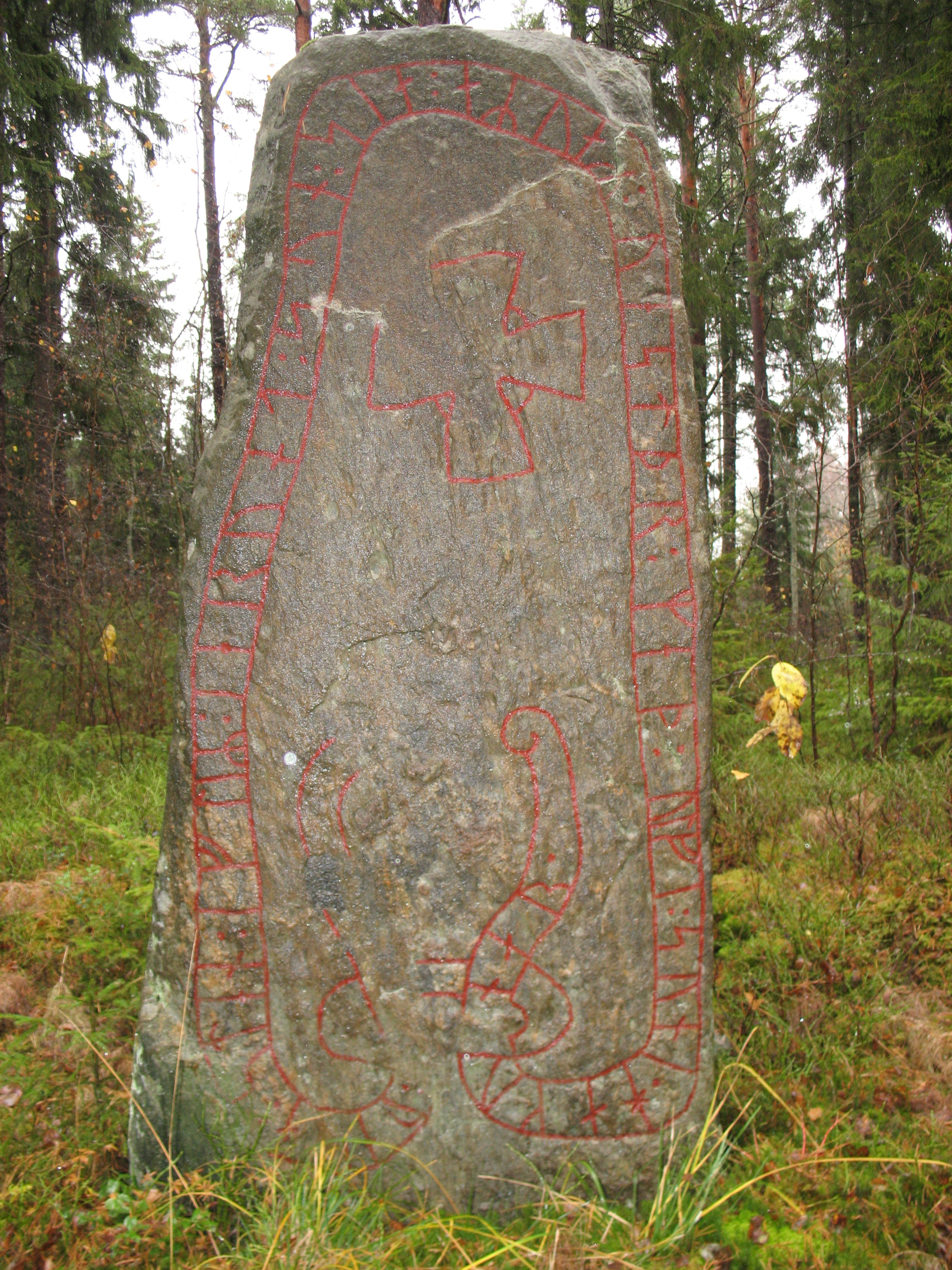
Sö 260.

This runestone is located in Södra Beteby, and it may be one of the Hakon Jarl Runestones. It is not only the stone that has been found on the farm, but also a hoard of several hundred English coins. More Anglo-Saxon pennies of this period have been found in Sweden than in England due to the Danegelds.

Omeljan Pritsak argues that this Hakon is the same as the one who is mentioned on the Bro Runestone and whose son Ulf was in the west, i.e. in England. This Swedish Hakon Jarl would then actually be the Norwegian Hákon Eiríksson.

… … ...a : stin : eftiʀ : ierunt : sun : sia : aʀ * uaʀ : uestþr : meþ ulfi : suni * hakunar *
… … [ræis]a {} stæin {} æftiʀ {} Iarund, {} sun {} sinn, {} eʀ {} vaʀ {} vestr {} með Ulfi, {} syni {} Hakonaʀ. {}
"… … raise the stone in memory of Jôrundr, his son, who was in the west with Ulfr, Hákon's son."

==== Sö 319 ====
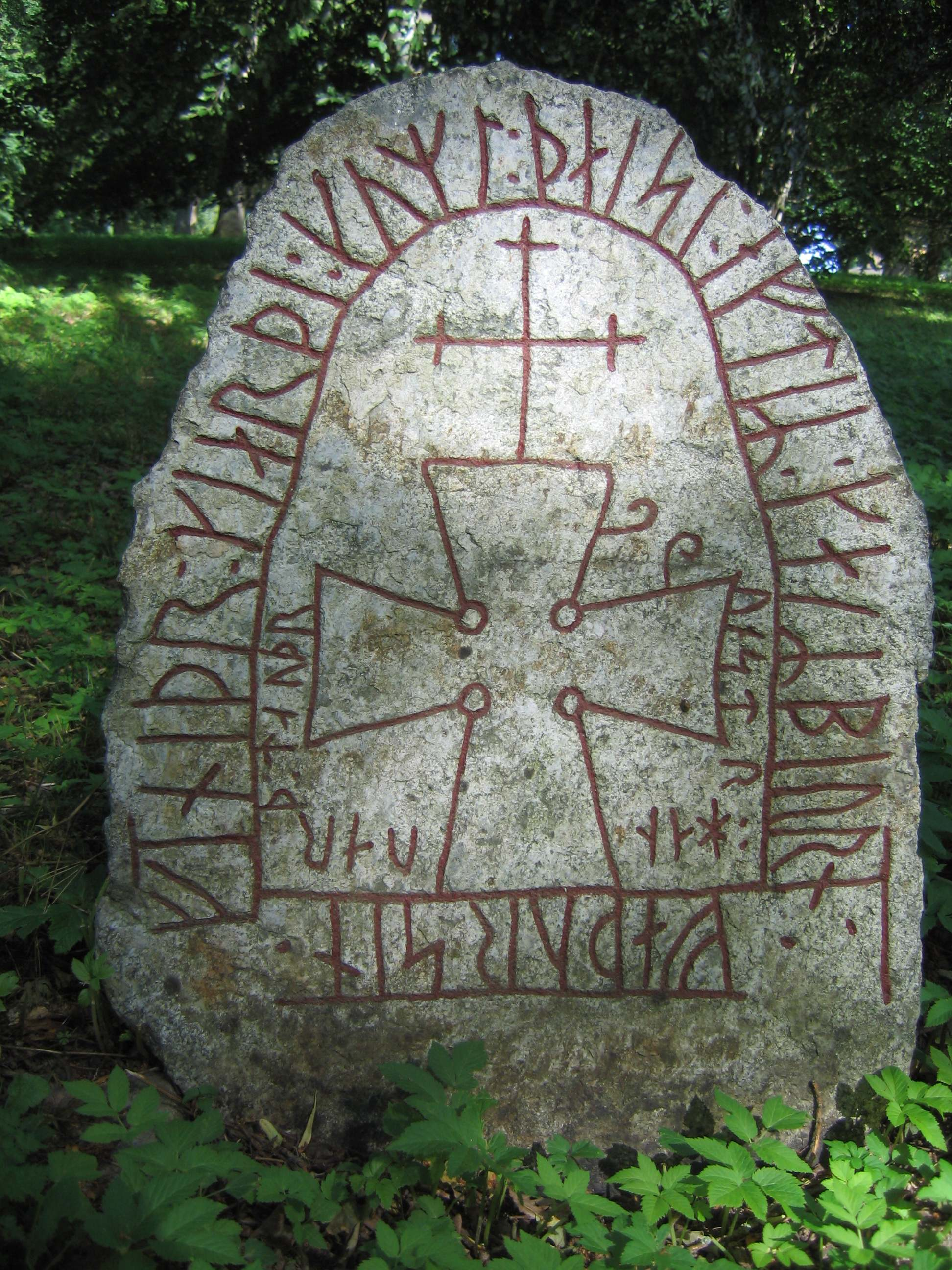
Sö 319.

This runestone was found in Sannerby, but was moved to the park of the manor house Stäringe, where it is now raised beside the runestone Sö 320. It is carved in runestone style RAK.

: finiþr : kiarþi : kuml : þaisi : eftiʀ : kaiʀbiurn : faþur sin :: han uarþ : tauþr uestr
{} Finnviðr(?) {} gærði {} kuml {} þessi {} æftiʀ {} Gæiʀbiorn, {} faður sinn. {} Hann varð {} dauðr vestr.
"Finnviðr(?) made these monuments in memory of Geirbjôrn, his father. He died in the west."

=== Östergötland ===
==== Ög 68 ====
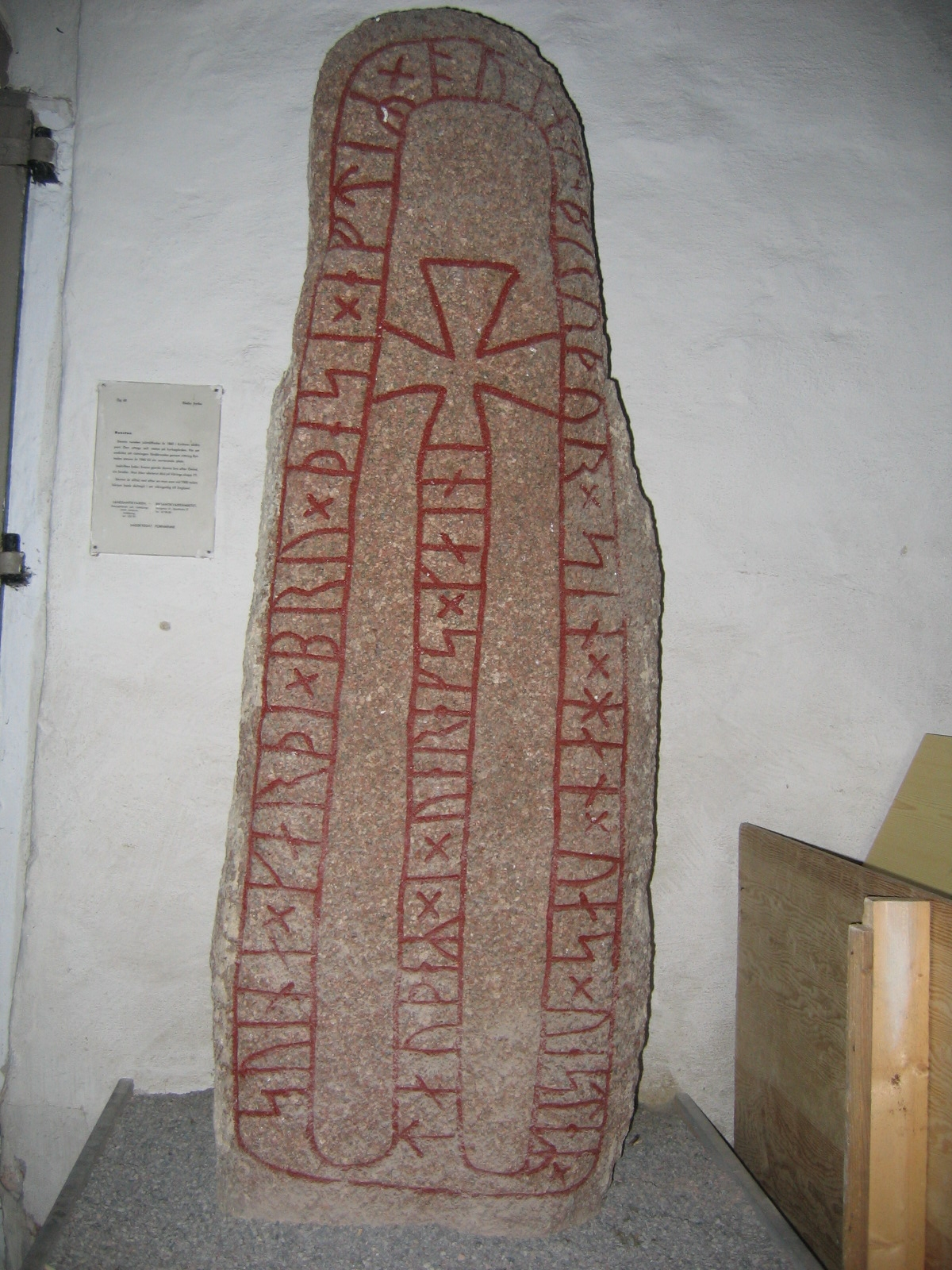
Ög 68.

This runestone was found at the church of Ekeby, and it was moved into the church porch in 1961. It is carved in runestone style RAK. It mentions the death of a man named Kyela who died while participating in an expedition westwards under a chieftain named Væringr. Erik Brate considers this Væringr to be the one who is mentioned on runestone Ög 111, below.

suina × karþi × bru × þesi × eftiʀ × ouint × bruþur × sin × han × uas × uesteʀ × tauþeʀ × i × uereks × (k)ai-i
Svæina {} gærði {} bro {} þessi {} æftiʀ {} Øyvind, {} broður {} sinn. {} Hann {} vas {} vestr {} dauðr {} i {} Værings {} <kai-i>.
"Sveina made this bridge in memory of Eyvindr, his brother. He died in the west on Væringr's ..."

==== Ög 83 ====
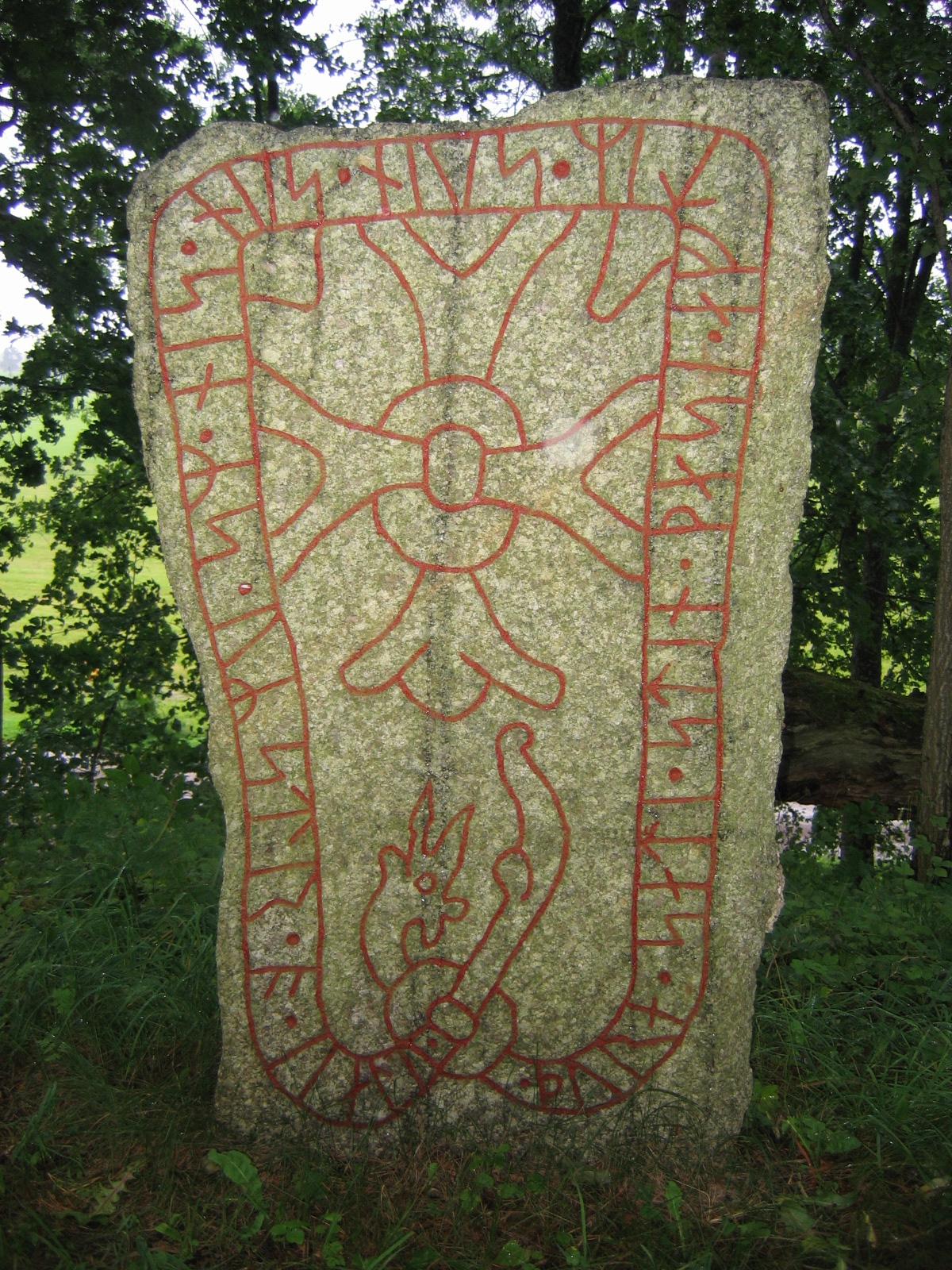
Ög 83.

Ög 83 is one of the runestones of Högby and it is tentatively categorized as being in runestone style Pr1-Pr2. In this style the serpent or beast heads at the ends of the text bands are depicted in profile, but the serpents or beasts are not as elongated and stylized as in the Urnes style. It was made in memory of a son who died in the West.

* þura * sati * stin * þasi * aftiʀ * suin * sun * sin * ʀs * uʀstr * o * ualu
{} Þora {} satti {} stæin {} þannsi {} æftiʀ {} Svæin, {} sun {} sinn, {} es {} vestr {} a {} <ualu>
"Þóra placed this stone in memory of Sveinn, her son, who died in the west in <ualu>."

==== Ög 111 ====
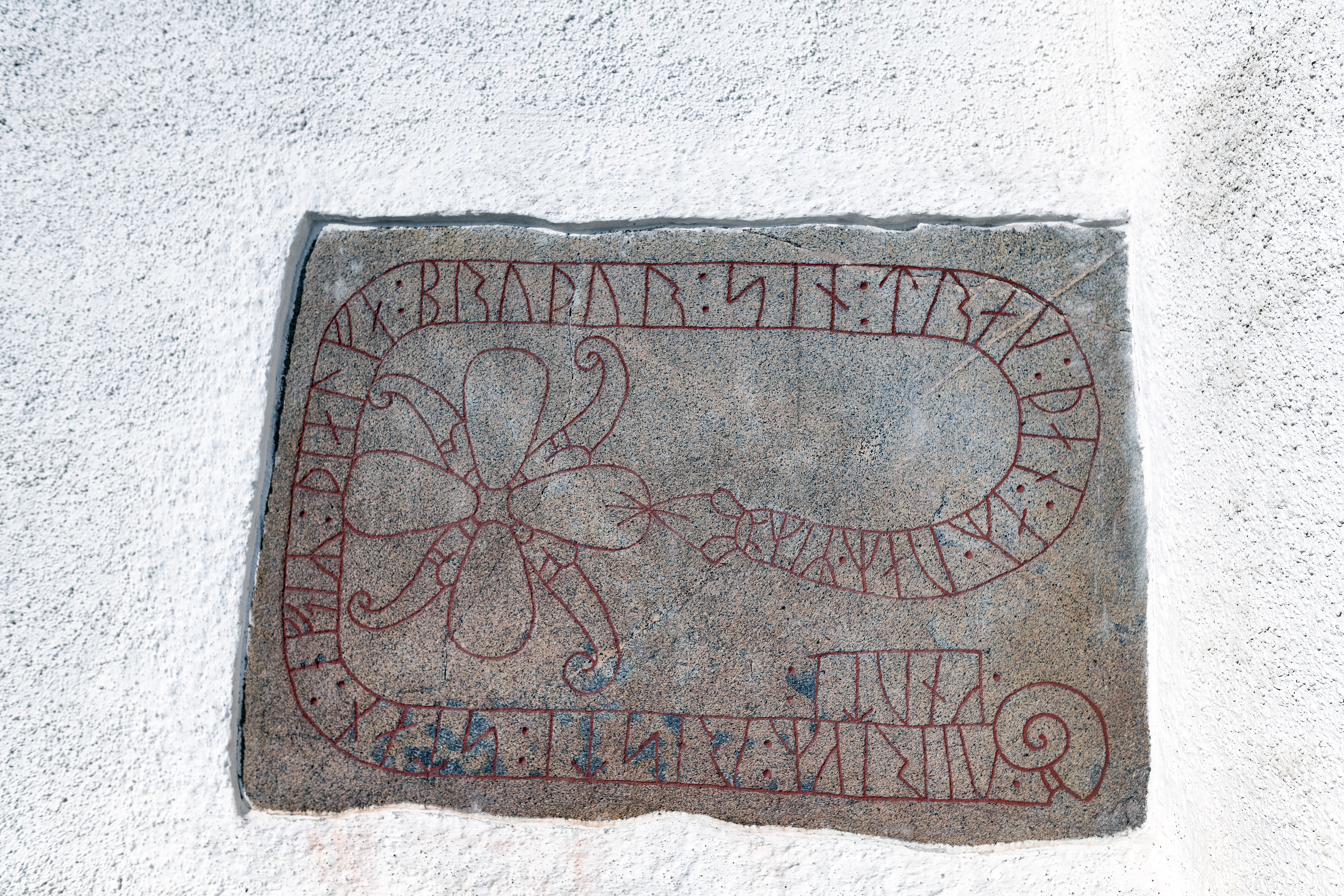
Ög 111.

This inscription in runestone style Fp is located in the wall of the church of Landeryd. It was raised by a man named Væringr in memory of a brother who had served under Canute the Great. Erik Brate considers this Væringr to be same man as the one who is mentioned on runestone Ög 68, above. The cross is in Ringerike style.

* uirikʀ : resti : stan : eftiʀ : þialfa : bruþur : sin : trak : þan : aʀ * uaʀ * miʀ * knuti :
{} Væringʀ {} ræisti {} stæin {} æftiʀ {} Þialfa, {} broður {} sinn, {} dræng {} þann, {} eʀ {} vaʀ {} með {} Knuti. {}
"Væringr raised the stone in memory of Þjalfi, his brother, the valiant man who was with Knútr."

==== Ög Fv1970;310 ====
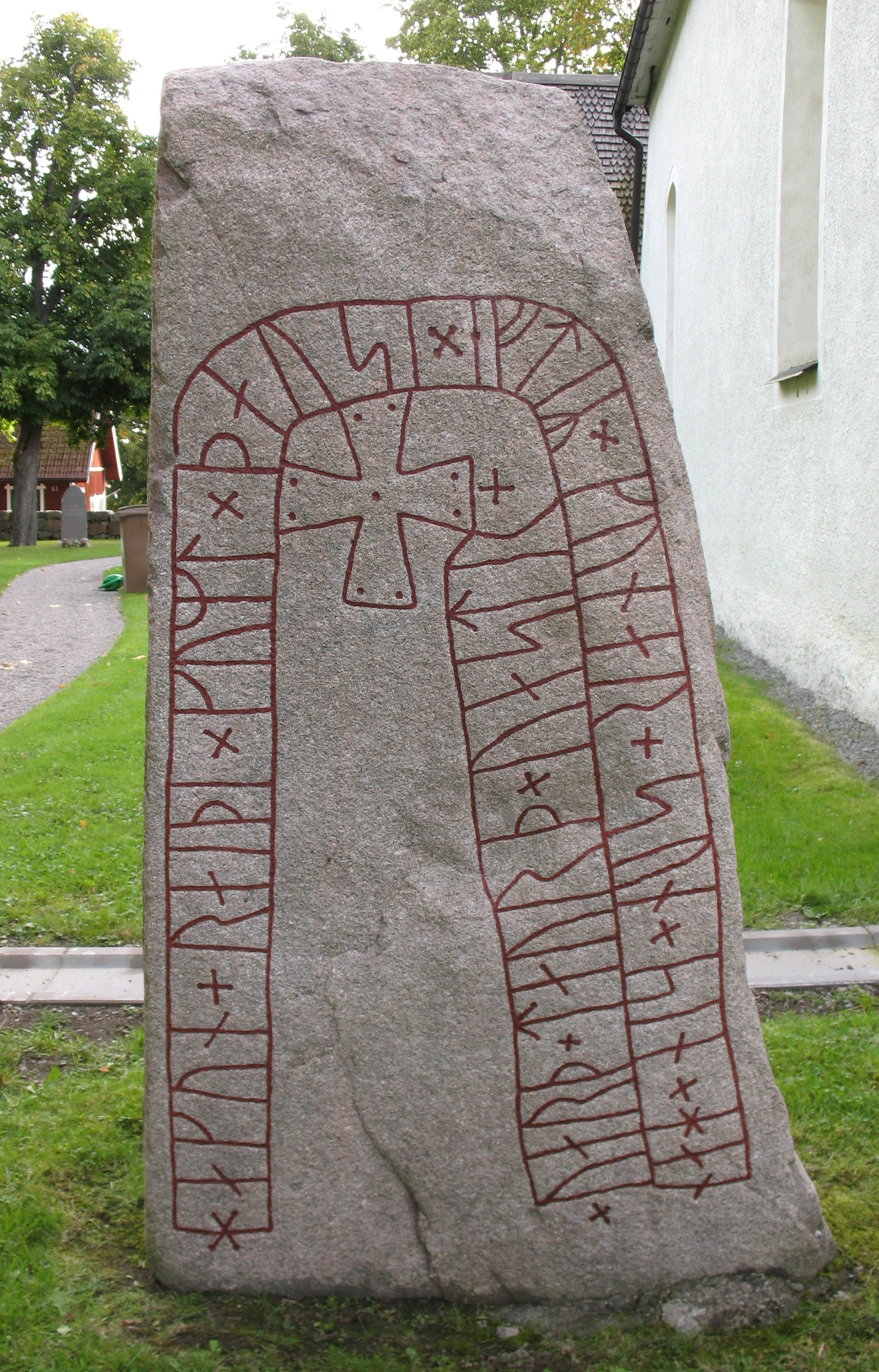
Ög Fv1970;310.

This runestone from the first half of the 11th century was discovered in June 1969 in the cemetery wall some 40 metres from the gate of the church of Kullerstad. The engraved side had been facing inwards. The stone was raised next to the entrance to the church. It is in light red granite and it is 1.84 m tall (1.55 m above the soil) and 84 cm wide. The length of the runes is between 12 and 15 cm. It was raised by Hákon in memory of his son Gunnarr and both men are also known from the runestone Ög 162 at Gunnar's bridge located about one-half km north of the church. The inscription on Ög 162 relates that Hákon named the bridge in memory of his son Gunnarr. The runestone which was discovered at the church was probably the main memorial, but it reports that at least two memorials had been raised in Gunnarr's memory. It is consequently likely that both runestones formed a twinned memorial at Gunnar's bridge, and they were probably made by the same runemaster.

hakun + raiþi × kuml × þausi × eftiʀ × kunar + sun × sin × han × uarþ × taurþ × uastr +
Hakon {} ræisþi {} kumbl {} þausi {} æftiʀ {} Gunnar, {} sun {} sinn. {} Hann {} varð {} dauðr {} vestr. {}
"Hákon raised these monuments in memory of Gunnarr, his son. He died in the west."

=== Västergötland ===
==== Vg 61 ====
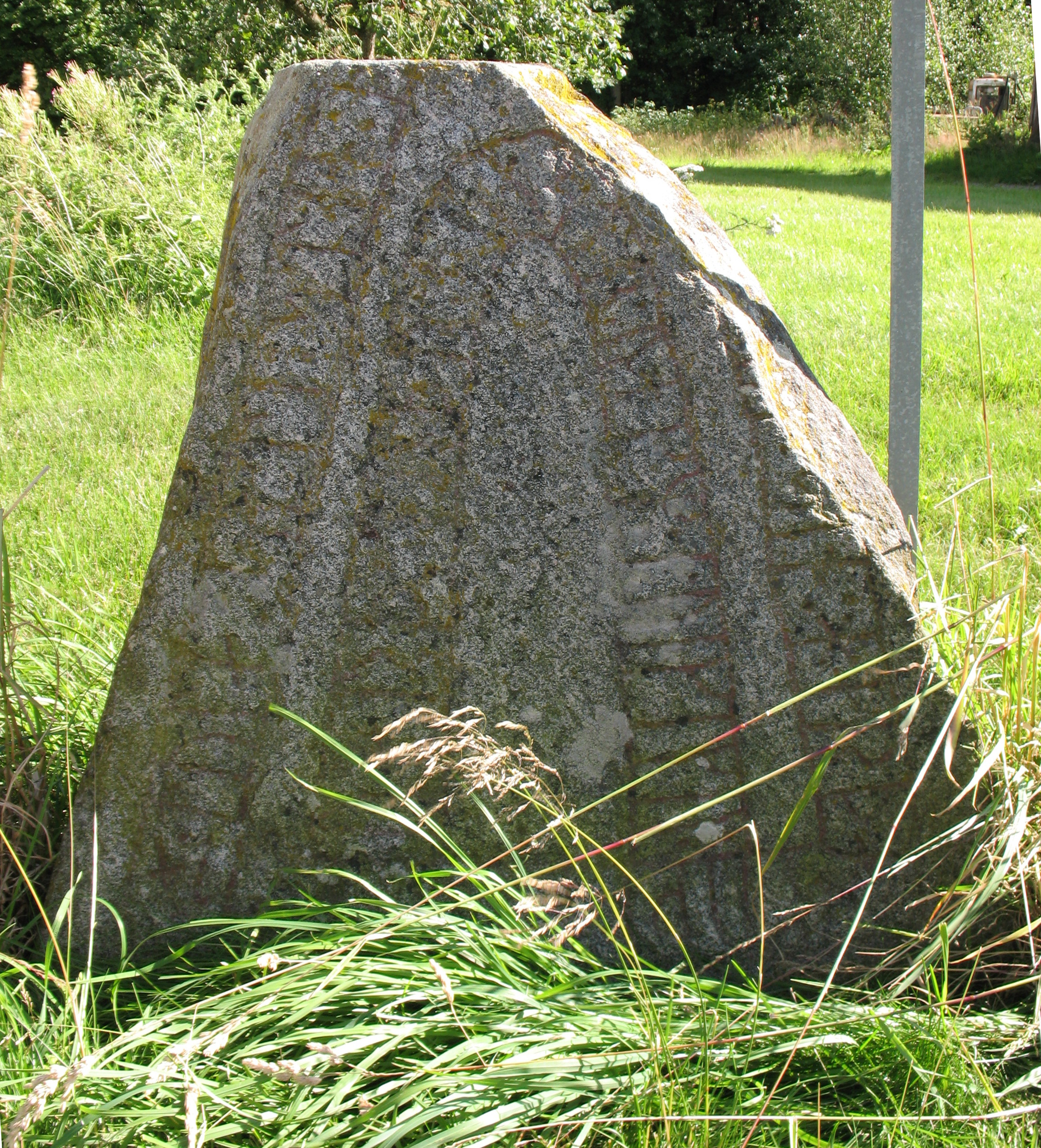
Vg 61.

This runestone is raised at Härlingstorp. It is carved in runestone style RAK and was raised in memory of a man who died on the western route. Only two other runestones, Viking runestones DR 330 and 334, use the phrase i vikingu, literally "in Viking," and here with the combination of "on the western route" probably indicates that he died during the wars in England.

: tula : sati : sten : þ... ...[iʀ kʀ : sun] : sin : harþa × kuþon : trok : sa × uarþ : tuþr : o : uastr:uakm : i : uikiku :
{} Tola {} satti {} stæin {} þ[annsi æft]iʀ {} Gæiʀ, sun {} sinn, {} harða {} goðan {} dræng. {} Sa {} varð {} dauðr {} a {} vestrvegum {} i {} vikingu. {}
"Tóla placed this stone in memory of Geirr, her son, a very good valiant man. He died on a Viking raid on the western route."

==== Vg 197 ====
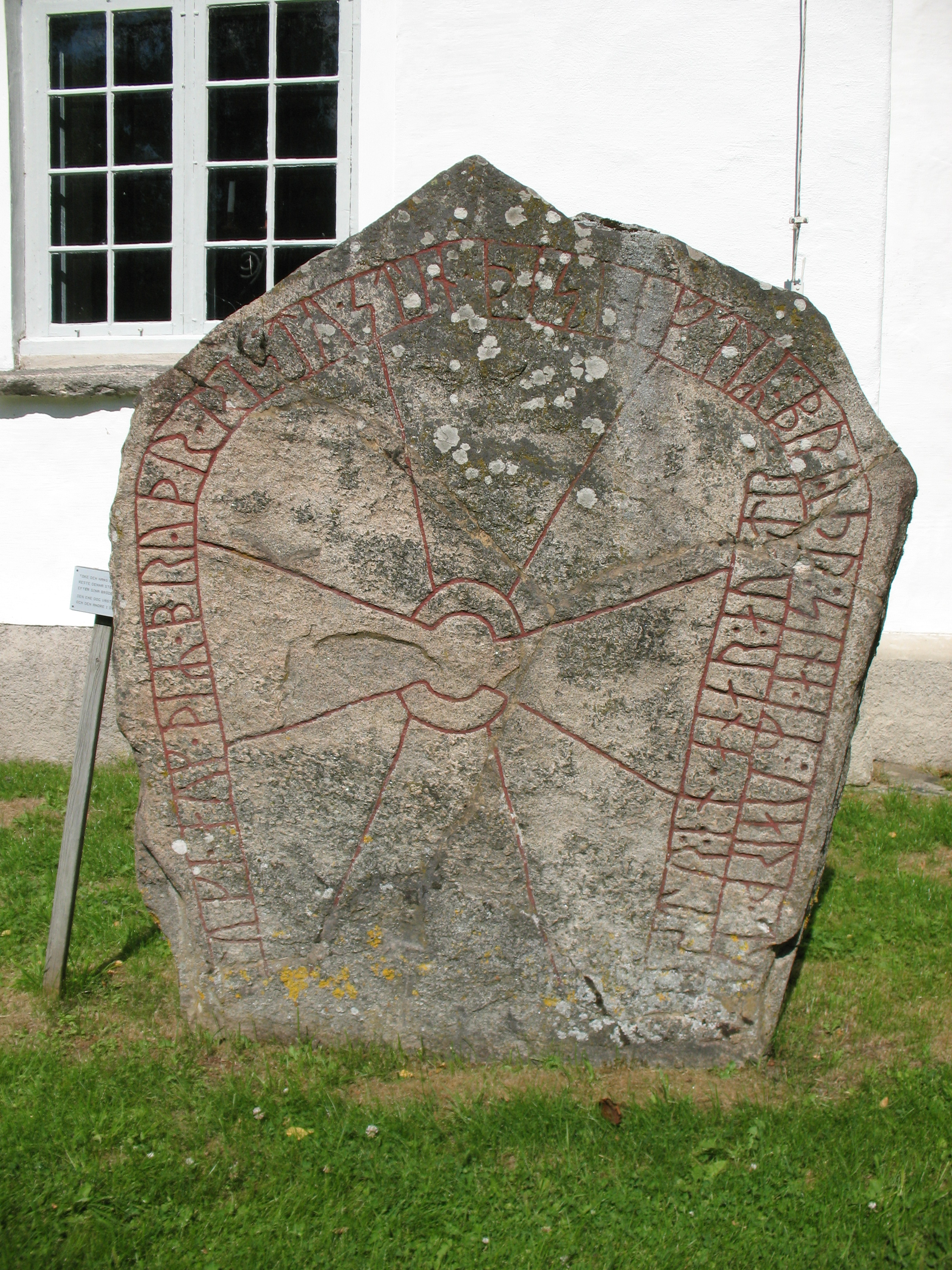
Vg 197.

This runestone is found on the cemetery of the church of Dalum. It was raised in memory of two brothers of which one died in the east and the other one died in the west.

tuki * auk * þiʀ * bryþr * ristu * stin * þesi * eftiʀ : bryþr : sina * eʀ : uarþ * tu(þ)r uestr : en * anar : au(s)tr :
Toki {} ok {} þæiʀ {} brøðr {} ræistu {} stæin {} þennsi {} æftiʀ {} brøðr {} sina. {} Eʀ {} varð {} dauðr vestr, {} en {} annarr {} austr. {}
"Tóki and his brothers raised this stone in memory of their brothers. One died in the west, another in the east."

=== Småland ===
==== Sm 10 ====
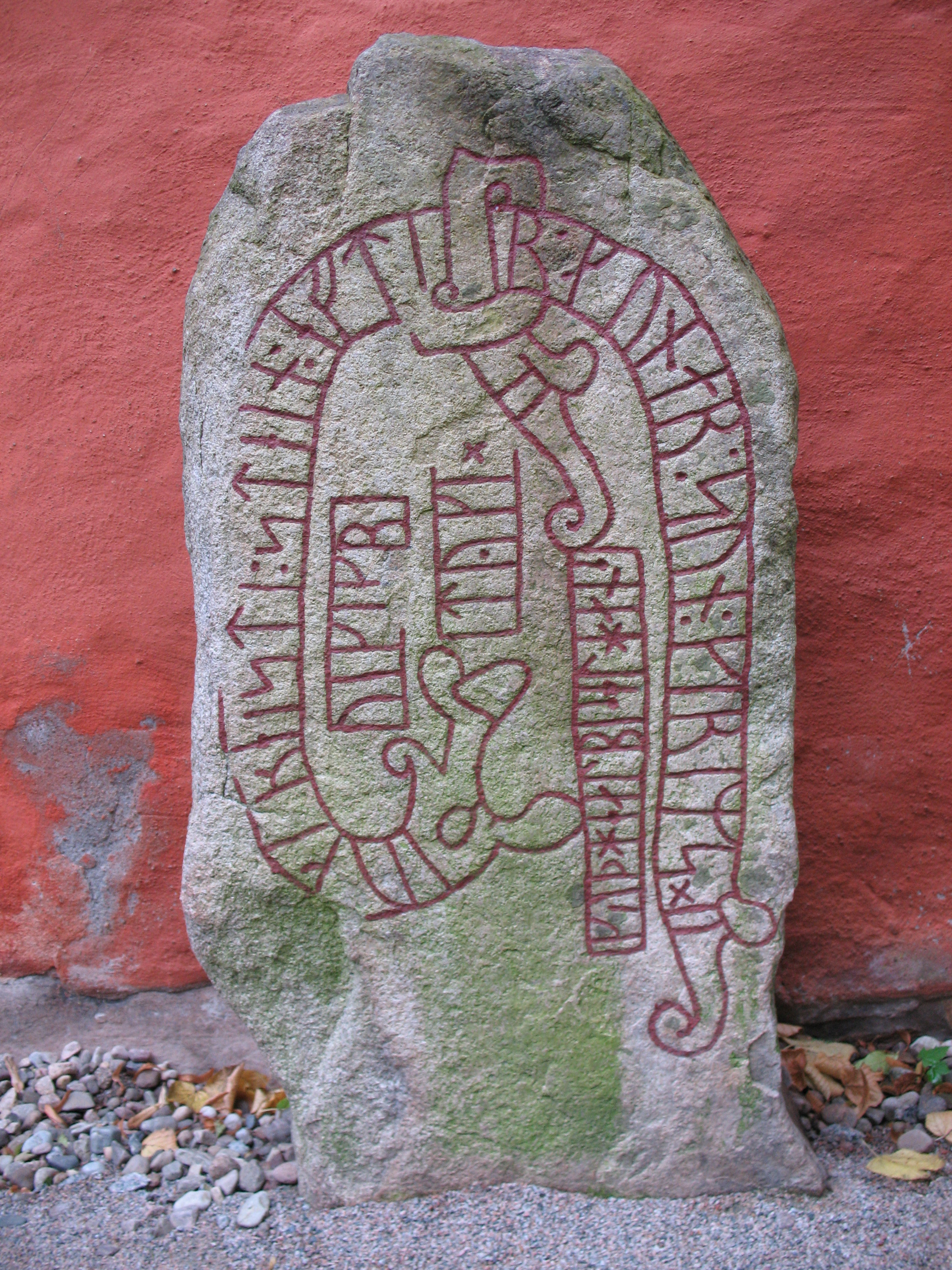
Sm 10.

This runestone is found at Växjö Cathedral near its western wall. Colloquially known as "the stone of Toki the viking" (Toke Vikings sten), it is raised by a man who entitled himself "the Viking" and is classified as being carved in runestone style Pr2, which is also known as Ringerike style. It was discovered in 1813 under plaster in the wall of the cathedral. The inscription starts at the head of the serpent, and the inscription is carved in the circular band that follows the sides of the stone until it reaches the x. The prayer is read from bottom-up in the right hand rectangle. The runes tyki are found above the serpent's head in the central rectangle, whereas the runes uikikr are found in the left-hand rectangle. The epithet Viking indicates that Tóki had taken part in Viking expeditions and it was probably used to distinguish him from other men named Tóki in the region.

-u(k)i tyki × uikikr reisti * stein * e(f)tir : kunar : sun : kirims × kuþ healbi sel hans
[T]oki, Toki {} Vikingʀ, ræisti {} stæin {} æftiʀ {} Gunnar, {} sun {} Grims. {} Guð hialpi salu hans!
"Tóki, Tóki the Viking, raised the stone in memory of Gunnarr, Grímr's son. May God help his soul!"

==== Sm 42 ====
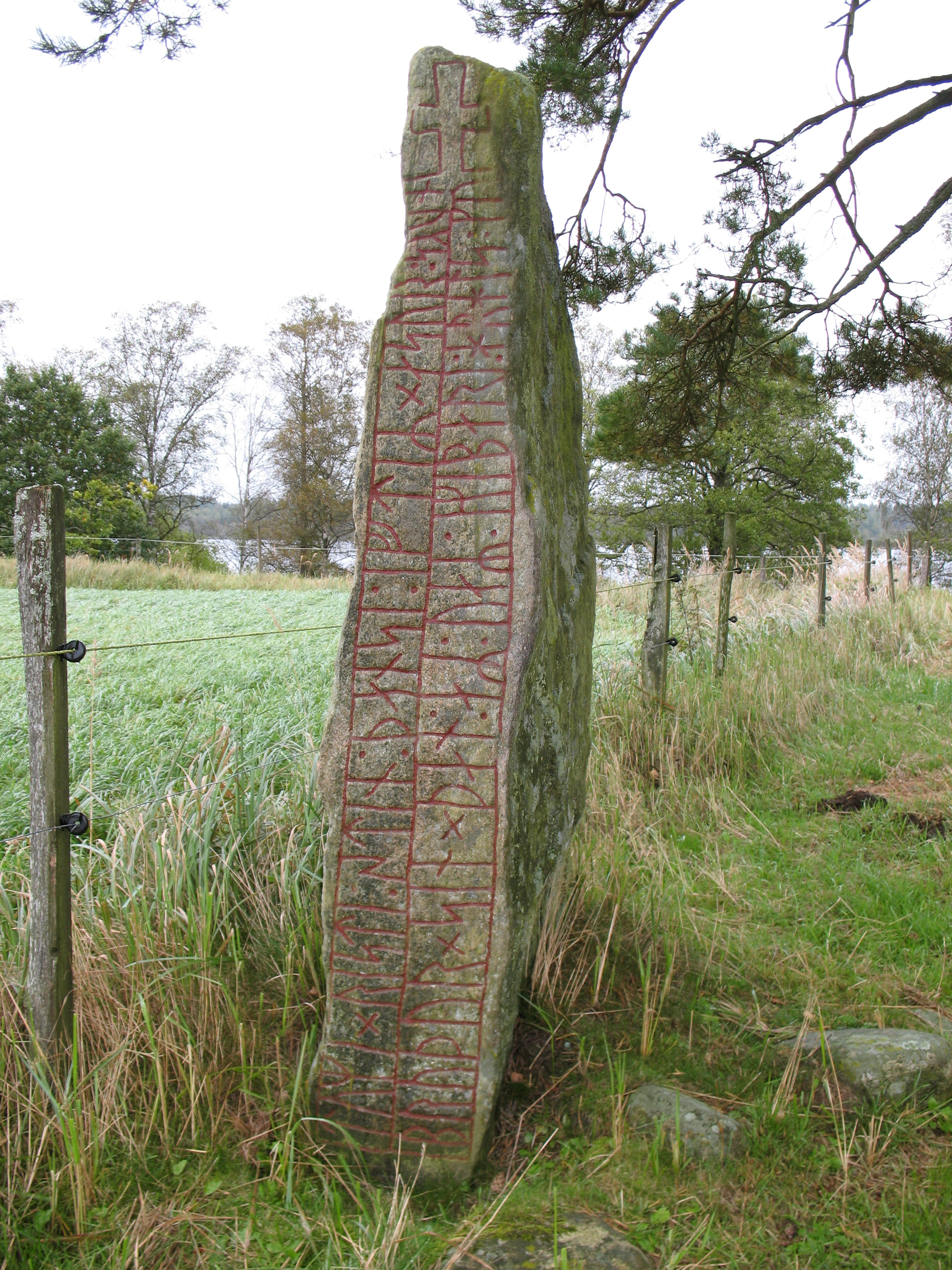
Sm 42.

This runestone in style RAK is located in Tuna. It was raised in memory of Özurr who was in the service of a king named Harald, who was probably the English king Harold Harefoot. Serving as a skipari or "seaman" on the king's longship was a great honour and Özurr was consequently part of the king's retinue, the þingalið. Other runestones unsing the title skipari include DR 82 in Sønder Vinge, DR 218 in Tågerup, DR 275 in Solberga, DR 363 in Sturkö, DR 379 in Ny Larsker, Sö 171 in Esta, and Sö 335 in Ärja. On this runestone, the runemaster used a bind rune to combine the s-rune and k-rune in skipari. According to a local tradition, "ancient coins" were once found near the stone, and these coins were possibly Özur's payment from his service in England.

tumi × risti : stin : þansi : iftiʀ × asur : bruþur × sin × þan : aʀ : uaʀ : s=kibari : hrhls : kunuks
Tumi/Tummi/Domi {} ræisti {} stæin {} þannsi {} æftiʀ {} Assur, {} broður {} sinn, {} þann {} eʀ {} vaʀ {} skipari {} Haralds {} kunungs.
"Tumi/Tummi/Dómi raised this stone in memory of Ôzurr, his brother, he who was King Haraldr's seaman."

==== Sm 51 ====
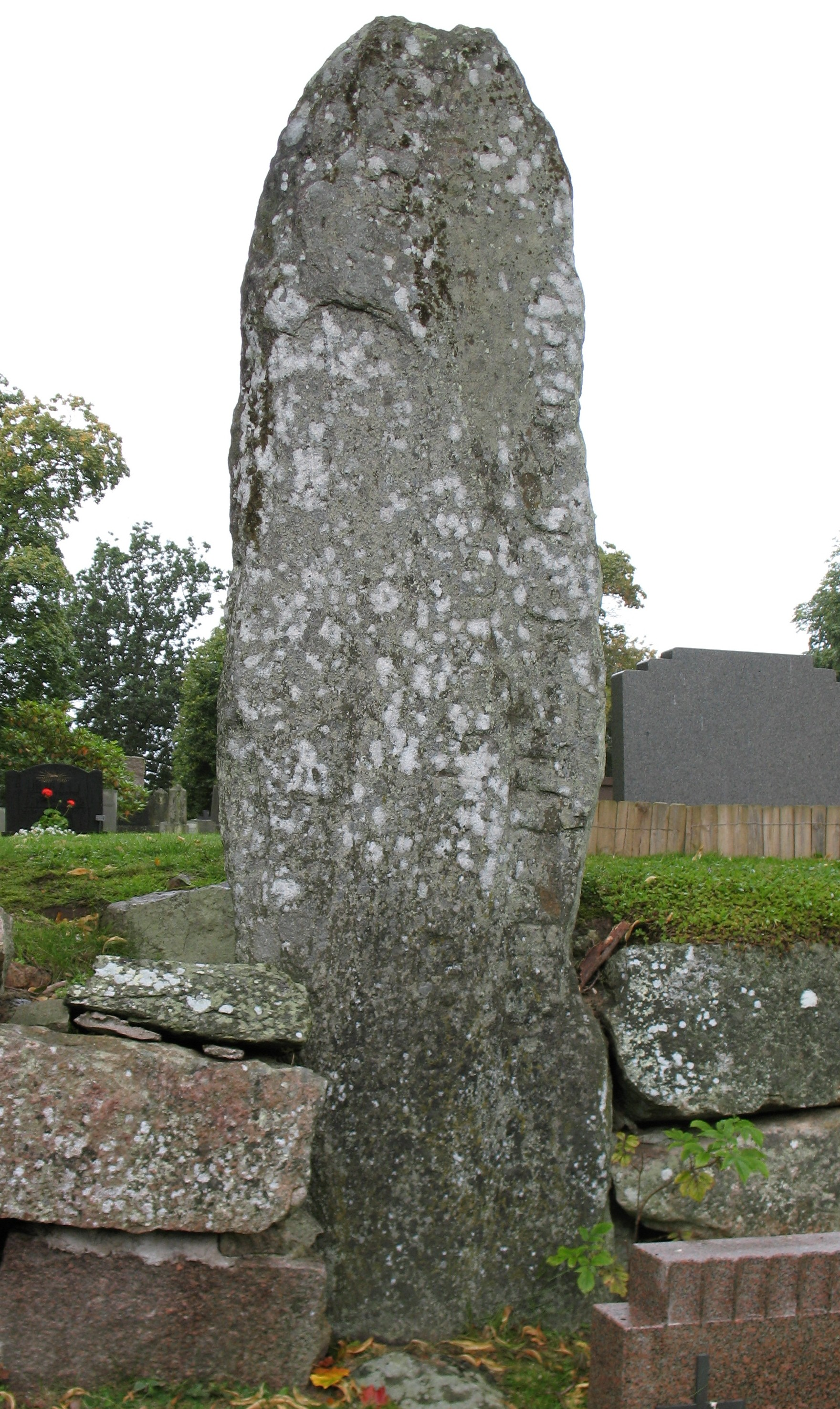
Sm 51.

This runestone is located near the old exterior wall of the cemetery of the church of Forsheda. It was discovered in 1866 during the rebuilding of the church. It is classified as being carved in runestone style RAK and was raised in memory of a man who died vestarla or westwards.

tusti × (r)...(i) ...tin × efti(ʀ) kuno × mak × sin × þ... ...---s × … × uistar- × uar- …
Tosti {} r[æist]i [s]tæin {} æftiʀ Gunna, {} mag {} sinn, {} … … {} … {} vestar[la] {} var[ð] …
"Tosti raised the stone in memory of Gunni, his kinsman-by-marriage … … … was westwards ..."

=== Gotland ===
==== G 370 ====
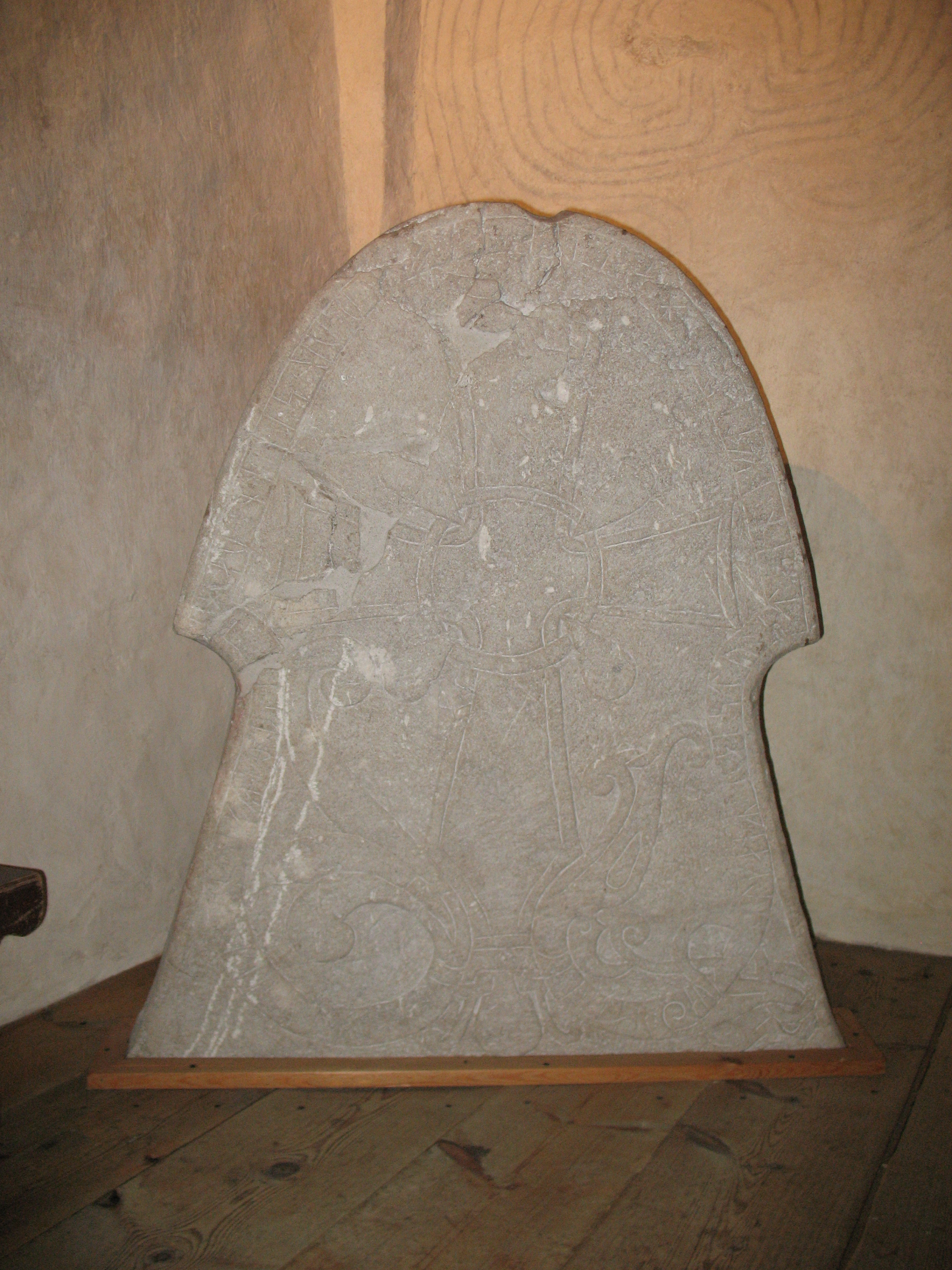
G 370.

This runestone is located at Hablingbo Church. The stone was discovered in 1988 while conducting excavation for a grave at the church cemetery, and was then moved to the church tower. It is classified as being carved in runestone style Pr3 and was raised in memory of a man who died when travelling in the west with vikingum or the Vikings. The inscription is considered to be an early use of the plural form of the word Vikings in Sweden, although it is also used on U 617 at Bro and on the Viking runestone DR 216 from Denmark.

uatar : auk … hilkaiʀ : raistu : stain : iftir … hailka … f-þur : sin : hn : uahʀ -istr : farin miþ uikikum
Hvatarr {} ok {} Hæilgæiʀʀ(?) {} ræistu {} stæin {} aftiʀ {} Hæilga, {} f[a]ður {} sinn. {} Hann {} var [v]estr {} farinn með vikingum.
"Hvatarr and Heilgeirr(?) raised the stone in memory of Helgi, their father. He travelled to the west with the Vikings."

=== Scania ===
==== DR 266 ====
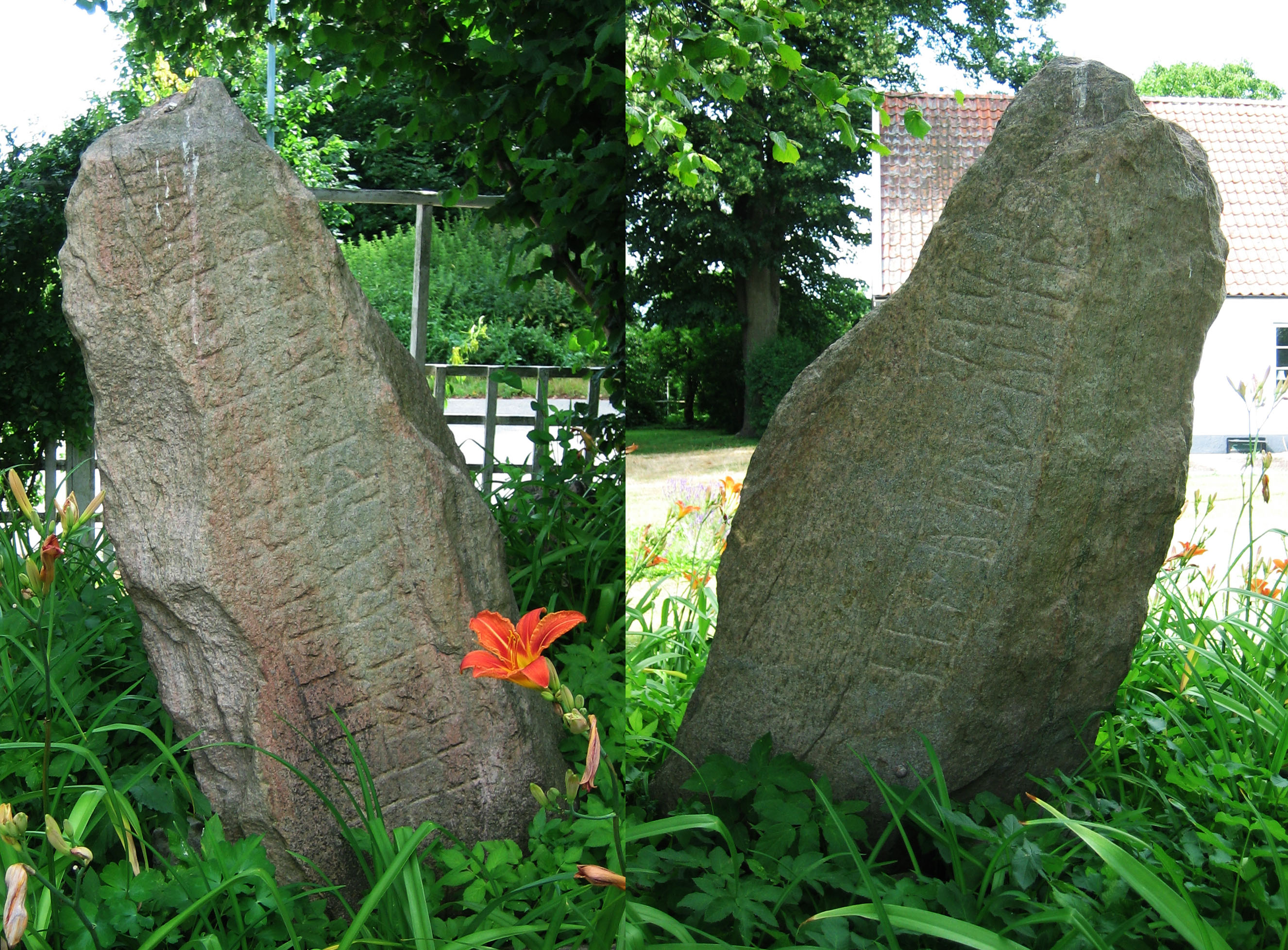
Runestone DR 266

This runestone, classified as being carved in runestone style RAK, was documented during the survey of runestones in the 17th century by Ole Worm as being located at Uppåkra, but it was later moved about 200 meters during the 19th century to Stenshöggård.

nafni × risþi × stin × þasi ¶ aftiʀ × tuka × bruþur × si[n]
Nafni {} resþi {} sten {} þæssi {} æftiʀ {} Toka, {} broþur {} sin.
"Nafni raised this stone in memory of Tóki, his brother."

han × uarþ × uistr ¶ tuþr
Han {} warþ {} wæstr {} døþr.
"He died in the west."

==== DR 330 ====
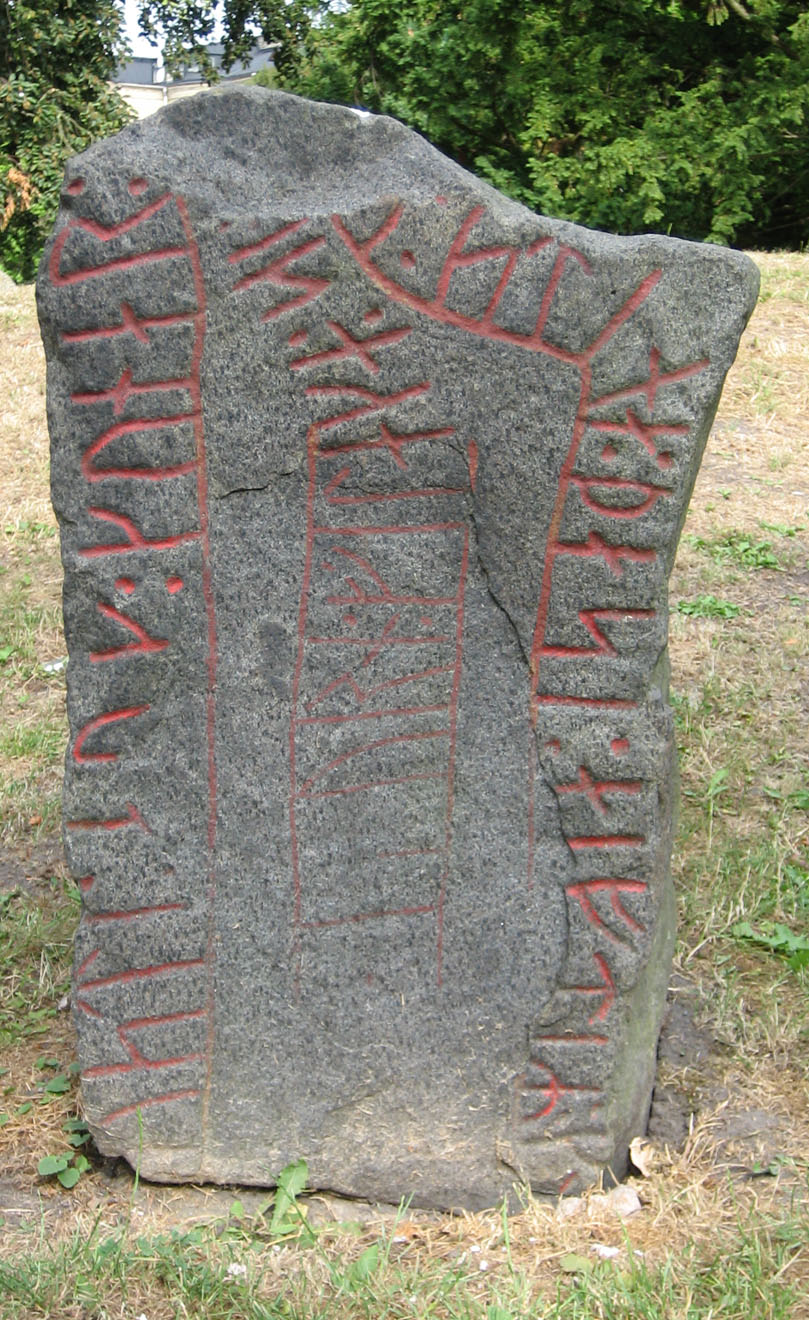
Runestone DR 330

This 11th century runestone was discovered at the church at Gårdstånga in 1867 (together with DR 331), but it is now located at "runestone hill" in Lund. It is classified as being carved in runestone style RAK. Although the runic text has been damaged, it describes the relationship between the men using the word felaga or "partner," which is related to félag, a mercantile partnership or financial joint venture.

...usti : auk : kunar : ...u : stina : þasi : aiftiʀ : kn... ¶ … ...biurn : filaka : si(n)(-)
Tosti(?) {} ok {} Gunnar {} … {} stena {} þæssi {} æftiʀ {} … {} [ok] ...biorn, {} felaga {} sin[a].
"Tosti(?) and Gunnarr … these stones in memory of … [and] ...-bjôrn, their partners."

: þiʀ : trikaʀ : uaʀu : u--(-) --isiʀ : i * uikiku
{} Þeʀ {} drængiaʀ {} waʀu {} w[iþa] [un]esiʀ {} i {} wikingu.
"These valiant men were widely renowned on Viking raids."

==== DR 334 ====
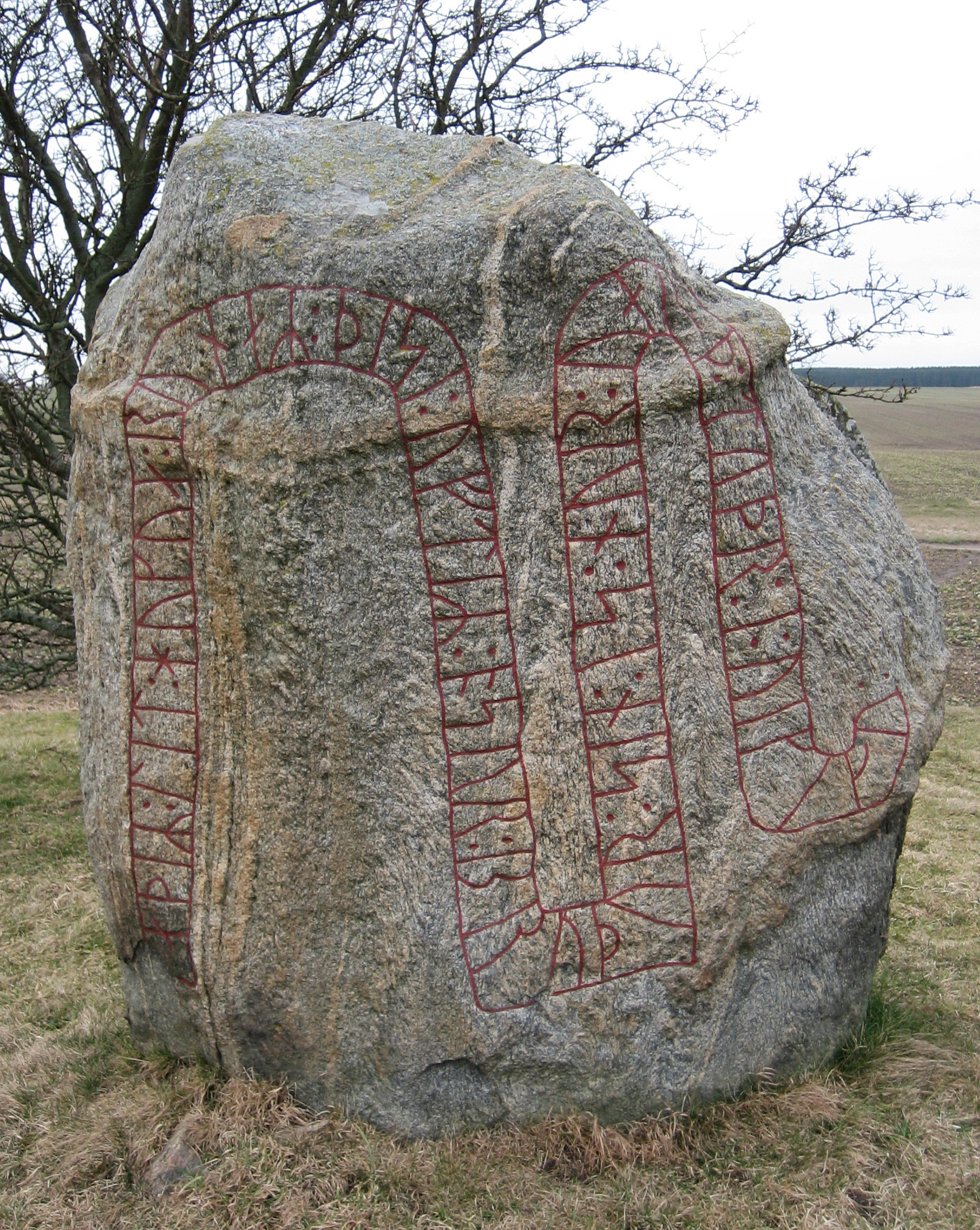
Runestone DR 334

This runestone is carved in runestone style RAK and is part of the Västra Strö monument, which has five standing stones and two runestones, DR 334 and DR 335. The monument was in good shape when documented by Ole Worm in 1643, but a survey in 1876 found that all of the stones had fallen except one. The monument was restored in 1932 by the Lund Kulturen. The inscription on DR 334 is considered to have been carved by the same runemaster who did DR 335, which memorializes a deceased ship owner. Both memorial runestones were also sponsored by the same man, Faðir, who on DR 334 memorializes his deceased brother Ôzurr, who died i wikingu or on a Viking raid or expedition. It has been suggested that all three men may have participated on this raid or expedition.

The stone is known locally as the Västra Ströstenen 1.

faþiʀ : lit : hukua : runaʀ : þisi : uftiʀ : osur : bruþur : sin : is : nur : uarþ : tuþr : i : uikiku :
Faþiʀ {} let {} hoggwa {} runaʀ {} þæssi {} æftiʀ {} Azur, {} broþur {} sin, {} æs {} nor {} warþ {} døþr {} i {} wikingu. {}
"Faðir had these runes cut in memory of Ôzurr, his brother, who died in the north on a Viking raid."

== Denmark ==
=== DR 216 ===
DR 216

This runestone originates from Tirsted on the island of Lolland, Denmark. It is the earliest native Scandinavian document that mentions Sweden together with the runestones DR 344 and Sö Fv1948;289. It is raised in memory of a Viking who died in Sweden and according to one reading, he fought in the retinue of Freygeirr. It is on permanent display at the Danish National Museum.

osraþr auk hiltu(-)-ʀ ¶ raisþu stain þansi ¶ aft froþa fronti sin ¶ sin ian han uas þo foink ¶ uaiʀa
Asraþr ok Hildu[ng]ʀ/Hildv[ig]ʀ/Hildu[lf]ʀ {} resþu sten þænsi {} æft Fraþa/Fræþa, frænda sin {} sin, æn han was þa fækn(?) {} wæʀa

ian han uarþ tauþr o suo¶þiauþu auk uas furs ¶ i frikis ioþi þo aliʀ uikikaʀ
æn han warþ døþr a Sweþiuþu ok was fyrst(?) {} i(?) Friggis(?) liði(?) þa alliʀ wikingaʀ.
"Asrathr and Hildung/Hildvig/Hildulf erected this stone after Fretha, their kinsman, … he died in Sweden and was first .... of every Viking."

== See also ==
- List of runestones

== Sources ==
- Brate, Erik (1922). Sverges Runinskrifter. Stockholm, Natur & Kultur.
- Enoksen, Lars Magnar (1998). Runor: Historia, Tydning, Tolkning. Historiska Media, Falun. ISBN 91-88930-32-7
- Fuglesang, Signe Horn (1998). "Swedish Runestones of the Eleventh Century: Ornament and Dating". In Düwel, Klaus (ed.). Runeninschriften als Quellen interdisziplinärer Forschung. Walter de Gruyter. pp. 197–218. ISBN 3-11-015455-2.
- Gustavson, Helmer (1990). "Runfynd 1988" (PDF). Fornvännen. 85. Swedish National Heritage Board: 23–42. ISSN 1404-9430.
- Jansson, Sven B. (1980). Runstenar. STF, Stockholm. ISBN 91-7156-015-7
- Jesch, Judith (2001). Ships and Men in the Late Viking Age: The Vocabulary of Runic Inscriptions and Skaldic Verse. Woodbridge: Boydell Press. ISBN 0-85115-826-9.
- MacLeod, Mindy (2002). Bind-Runes: an Investigation of Ligatures in Runic Epigraphy. Uppsala: Institutionen för Nordiska Språk. ISBN 91-506-1534-3.
- Peterson, Lena (2002). Nordisk Runnamnslexikon, at the Swedish Institute for Linguistics and Heritage (Institutet för Språk och Folkminnen).
- Pritsak, Omeljan. (1981). The Origin of Rus'. Cambridge, Mass.: Distributed by Harvard University Press for the Harvard Ukrainian Research Institute. ISBN 0-674-64465-4
- Peterson, Lena; Elmevik, Lennart; Williams, Henrik, eds. (2004-09-18). Scandinavian Runic-text Database (2004 ed.). Department of Scandinavian Languages, Uppsala University.
- Strid, Jan Paul (2002). "Lexical Developments from Ancient Nordic to Old Nordic". In Bandle, Oskar; et al. (eds.). The Nordic Languages: an International Handbook of the History of the North Germanic Languages. Berlin: Walter de Gruyter. pp. 733–744. ISBN 3-11-014876-5.
- Svärdström, Elisabeth (1970). "Runfynd 1969" (PDF). Fornvännen. 65. Swedish National Heritage Board: 301–313. ISSN 1404-9430.
- Thunberg, Carl L. (2010). Ingvarståget och dess monument [The Ingvar Expedition and its Monuments]. Göteborgs universitet, CLTS. ISBN 978-91-981859-2-8.
- Zilmer, Kristel (2005). "He Drowned in Holmr's Sea, his Cargo-Ship Drifted to the Sea-Bottom, Only Three Came Out Alive": Records and Representations of Baltic Traffic in the Viking Age and the Early Middle Ages in Early Nordic Sources. Tartu University Press. ISBN 9949-11-089-0.
- The article Kjula in Nationalencyklopedin.
- A Swedish site on the runestone.
