= Enoksen =

Enoksen is a surname. Notable persons with that name include:

- Hans Enoksen (1956–2025), Greenlandic politician
- Henning Enoksen (1935–2016), Danish football player
- Lars Magnar Enoksen (born 1960), Swedish writer and Glima wrestler
- Odd Roger Enoksen (born 1954), Norwegian politician
