= Lars Magnar Enoksen =

Swedish writer and Glima wrestler (born 1960)

Lars Magnar Enoksen (born 1960) is a Swedish writer and Glima wrestler.

Enoksen was born in Malmö in 1960 to a Swedish mother and Norwegian father. As an author, he has written on runes and Nordic mythology, although as a popular rather than academic writer. His work has received very varied reviews and critique from academics and experts in Old Norse studies and runology; while Runor: Historia, tydning, tolkning (~Runes:History, deciphering, interpretation) is described by Professor Henrik Williams as the best introduction to runology written in Swedish, later works like Runor: Mästarens handbok (~Runes, the Master's handbook) was reviewed by Williams as riddled with mistakes and errors that range from simplifications to the directly misleading.

Lars_Lönnroth claims the books Djur och natur i fornnordisk mytologi (~Animals and nature in Norse mythology) and Vikingarnas egna ord ( In the Viking's own words), while certainly presenting fascinating myths and traditions on the way to be forgotten in a vivid and enthusiastic manner, are written entirely without insight of the modern research in the field as well as a lack of source criticism and national romantic thinking derived from the 1900s. Stefanie von Schnurbein wrote of Norrøne guder og myter (2008) that: "we can find all the methodologically and historically problematic assumptions that had already vexed Germanophile scholarship in the 1930s and earlier, as well as feminist spirituality later on: The questionable idea that myth mirrors social structures, a lack of source criticism, unsupportable theories of continuity between pre-historic past and present society, not to mention the unfounded claims about the superiority of goddesses in the Norse pantheon."

In 2000, he was awarded the Lengertz Literature Award (Lengertz litteraturpris), which is awarded to authors who write on subjects relevant to Scania.

== Bibliography ==
- Ärans blod 1988
- Starkaters sista nidingsdåd 1989
- Nattens drottning (1994)
- Lilla runboken (1995)
- Runor (1998)
- Skånska runstenar (1999)
- Fornnordisk mytologi enligt Eddans lärdomsdikter (2000)
- Odens korpar (2001)
- Skånska fornminnen (2001)
- Vikingarnas egna ord (2003)
- Vikingarnas stridskonst (2004)
- Gudar och gudinnor i Norden (2005)
- Djur och natur i fornnordisk mytologi (2006)
- Lilla boken om runor (2008)
- The secret art of Glima - an introduction to Viking martial arts (2008)
- Stora boken om Vikingarnas gudar och myter (2008)
- The History of Runic Lore (2011)
- Runor: Mästarens handbok. Lund: Historiska media, (2015). ISBN 978-91-7545-317-0
