= Eggeby stone =

Viking Age runestone in Sweden

Coordinates: 59°23′51″N 17°55′20″E

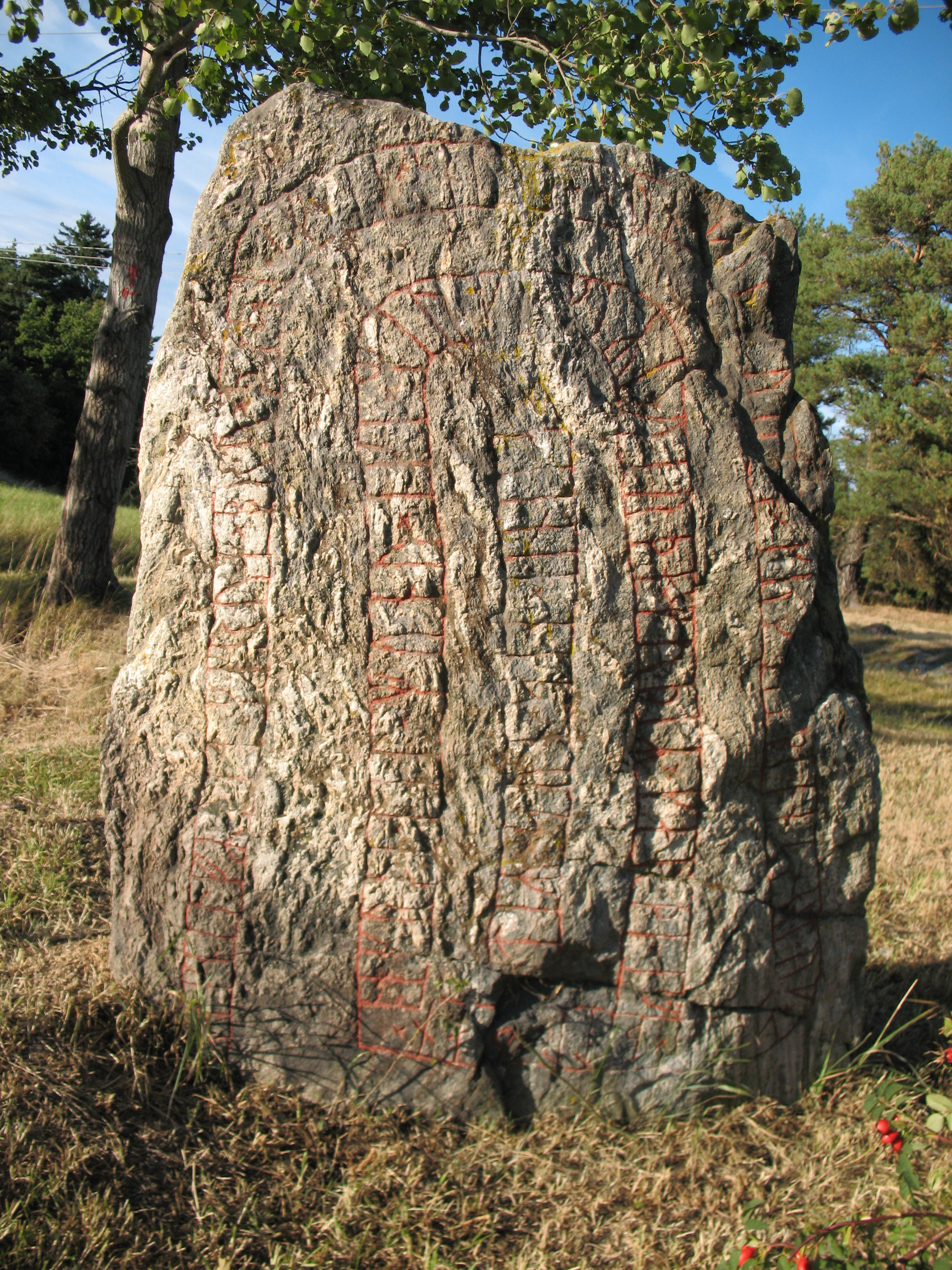
The Eggeby stone is a Christian memorial.

The Eggeby stone, designated as U 69 under the Rundata catalog, is a Viking Age memorial runestone that is located at Eggeby, which is 2 kilometers northwest of Central Sundbyberg, Sweden, which was in the historic province of Uppland.

== Description ==
The Eggeby stone inscription consists of runic text contained within bands. The inscription has been attributed to the runemaster Gunnar, who signed inscription U 225 in Bällsta. The inscription has been classified as having been carved in runestone style RAK, which is considered to be the oldest style. This is the classification for inscriptions with text bands that have straight ends without any attached serpent or beast heads.

The reference to bridge-building in the runic text is fairly common in runestones during this time period. Some are Christian references related to passing the bridge into the afterlife. At this time, the Catholic Church sponsored the building of roads and bridges through the use of indulgences in return for the church's intercession for the soul of the departed. There are over one hundred examples of bridge stones dated from the eleventh century, including inscriptions Sö 101 in Ramsund, Sö 328 in Tynäs, U 489 in Morby, U 839 in Ryda, and U993 in Brunnby. Consistent with this interpretation of the bridge referring to the passage to the afterlife, the text includes a prayer for the soul of Ônundr.

It has been pointed out that the final portion of the inscription is in verse:

Munu æigi mærki mæiʀi verða muþiʀ karþi i(f)tiʀ sun sin ainika	There will not be a greater memorial mother made after her only son

Another runestone raised by a woman where the normal memorial formula is followed by alliterative text is the Danish inscription DR 97 in Ålum.

== Inscription ==
raknilfʀ × lit × kirua × bru × þasi × iftiʀ × anunt + sun + s[i](n) [× k]uþan × kuþ ---bi × ons × ant × uk × salu × bitr × þan × on krþi × til × munu × iki × mirki × miʀi × uirþa × muþiʀ × karþi × i(f)tiʀ × sun × sin × ainika ×
Ragnælfʀ {} let {} gærva {} bro {} þessi {} æftiʀ {} Anund, {} sun {} sinn {} goðan. {} Guð [hial]pi {} hans {} and {} ok {} salu {} bætr {} þan {} hann gærði {} til. {} Munu {} æigi {} mærki {} mæiʀi {} verða, {} moðiʀ {} gærði {} æftiʀ {} sun {} sinn {} æiniga. {}
Ragnelfr had this bridge made in memory of Ônundr, her good son. May God help his spirit and soul better than he deserved. No landmark will be more (great). The mother made in memory of her only son.

== See also ==
- List of runestones
