= Uppland Runic Inscription 925 =

Creation of runemaster Öpir

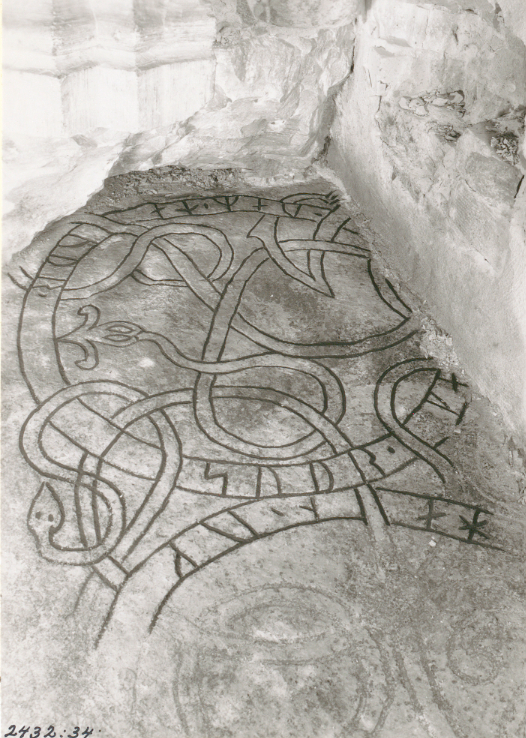

The Uppland Runic Inscription 925 is a Viking Age runestone engraved in Old Norse with the Younger Futhark runic alphabet. It is located under the wall between the De Geer and the Oxenstierna crypts, in Uppsala Cathedral, in Uppsala. The style is Pr4, and it was made by the runemaster Öpir.

== Inscription ==
' ihulbiarn ' uk ' alfnthan ' uk ' þelfi ' litu ' risa ' stin ' at ' kak ' sun ' sin ' uk ' faþur ' sin ' uaʀ ' tauþr ' i suþr ' kakr '
{} Igulbiorn {} ok {} Halfdan {} ok {} Þialfi {} letu {} ræisa {} stæin {} at {} Kag(?)/Gag(?), {} sun {} sinn {} ok {} faður {} sinn. {} Vaʀ {} dauðr {} i suðr {} Kagʀ(?)/Gagʀ(?). {}
"Ígulbjôrn and Halfdan and Þjalfi had the stone raised in memory of Kagr(?)/Gagr(?), their son, and their father. (He) died in the south Kagr(?)/Gagr(?)."

== See also ==
- List of runestones
