= Uppland Runic Inscription Fv1953;263 =

Rundata catalog listing for a Viking Age memorial runestone

Coordinates: 59.4158°N 17.9615°E

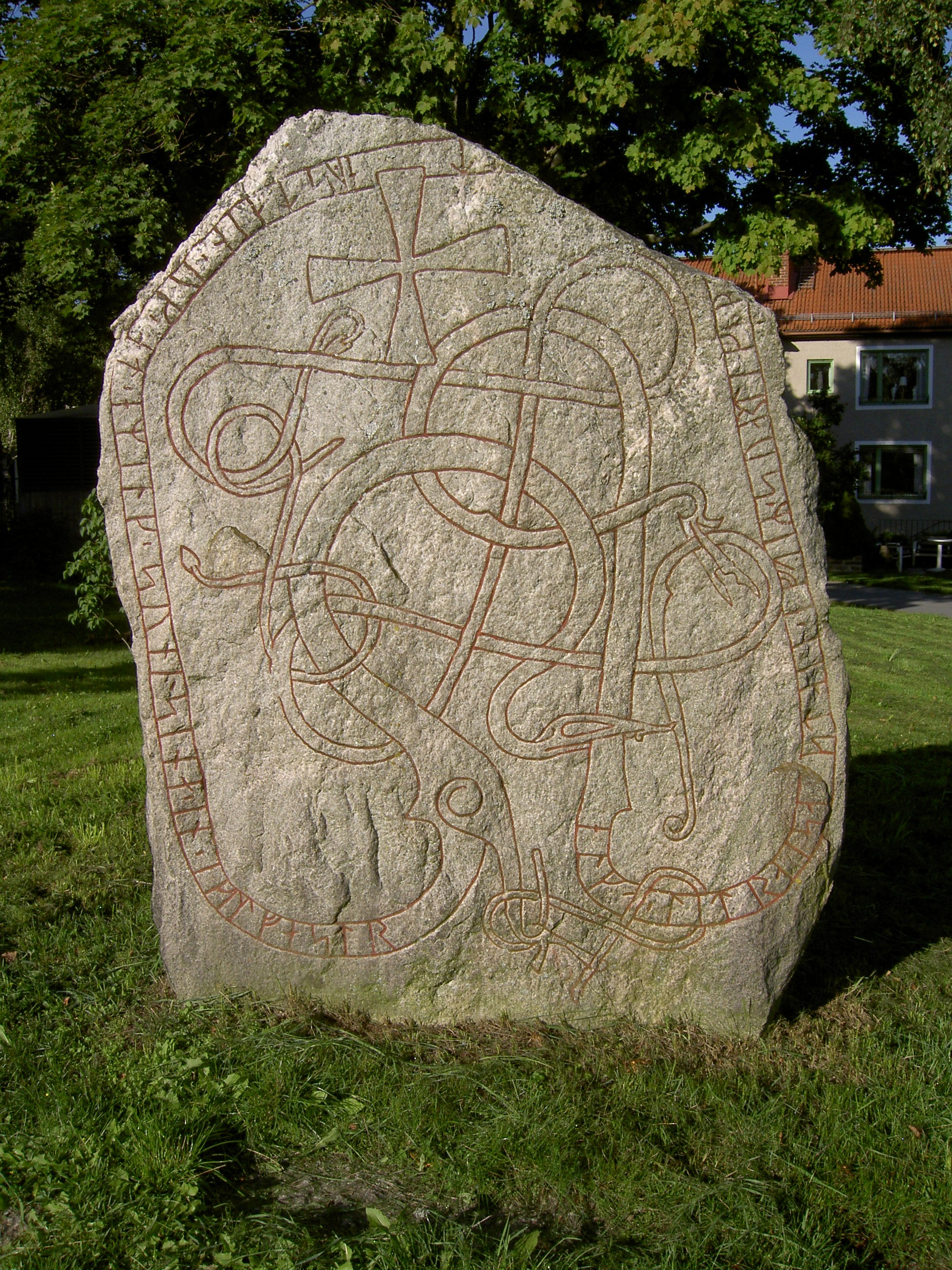
U Fv1953;263 in Helenelund.

Uppland Runic Inscription Fv1953;263 or U Fv1953;263 is the Rundata catalog listing for a Viking Age memorial runestone that was discovered at Helenelund, which is in Sollentuna, Stockholm County, Sweden, which was in the historic province of Uppland.

== Description ==
The inscription on U Fv1953;263, which is 1.8 meters in height and made of granite, is classified as being carved in runestone style Pr5, which is also known as Urnes style. This is the classification for text within runic bands with serpent or beast heads that are depicted in profile with almond-shaped eyes. The text, unlike many Viking Age inscriptions, is read from the tail of the serpent counterclockwise towards its head. A cross is near the top of the stone. The stone was discovered during construction of an access road on October 20, 1953, and is currently raised at the entrance to the Kummeby church.

The runic text, which is missing in one section of the damaged runestone, states that the stone was raised by Helga in memory of her husband Svertingr and her sons Eysteinn and Hemingr. The text ends with "and Ígulfastr," who is understood as being the runemaster who carved the inscription. U Fv1953;263 is the only surviving runestone signed by Ígulfastr, although the inscription on U 961 in Vaksala states that it was arranged by Ígulfastr and carved by the runemaster Öpir. Stylistically the work of Ígulfastr is very similar to that of Öpir, although it is not known which runemaster influenced the other. The runic text uses a bind rune, which is a ligature, combining an a-rune and l-rune in the name Svertingr. In addition, the runemaster connected the u-rune and l-rune in his signature. In some names on runestones, bind runes may have been ornamental and used to highlight the name. Lastly, an h-rune was left off at the beginning of the names Helga and Hemingr.

The Rundata designation for this Uppland inscription, U Fv1953;263, refers to the year and page number of the issue of Fornvännen in which the runestone was first described. The runestone is known locally as the Kummelbystenen.

== Inscription ==
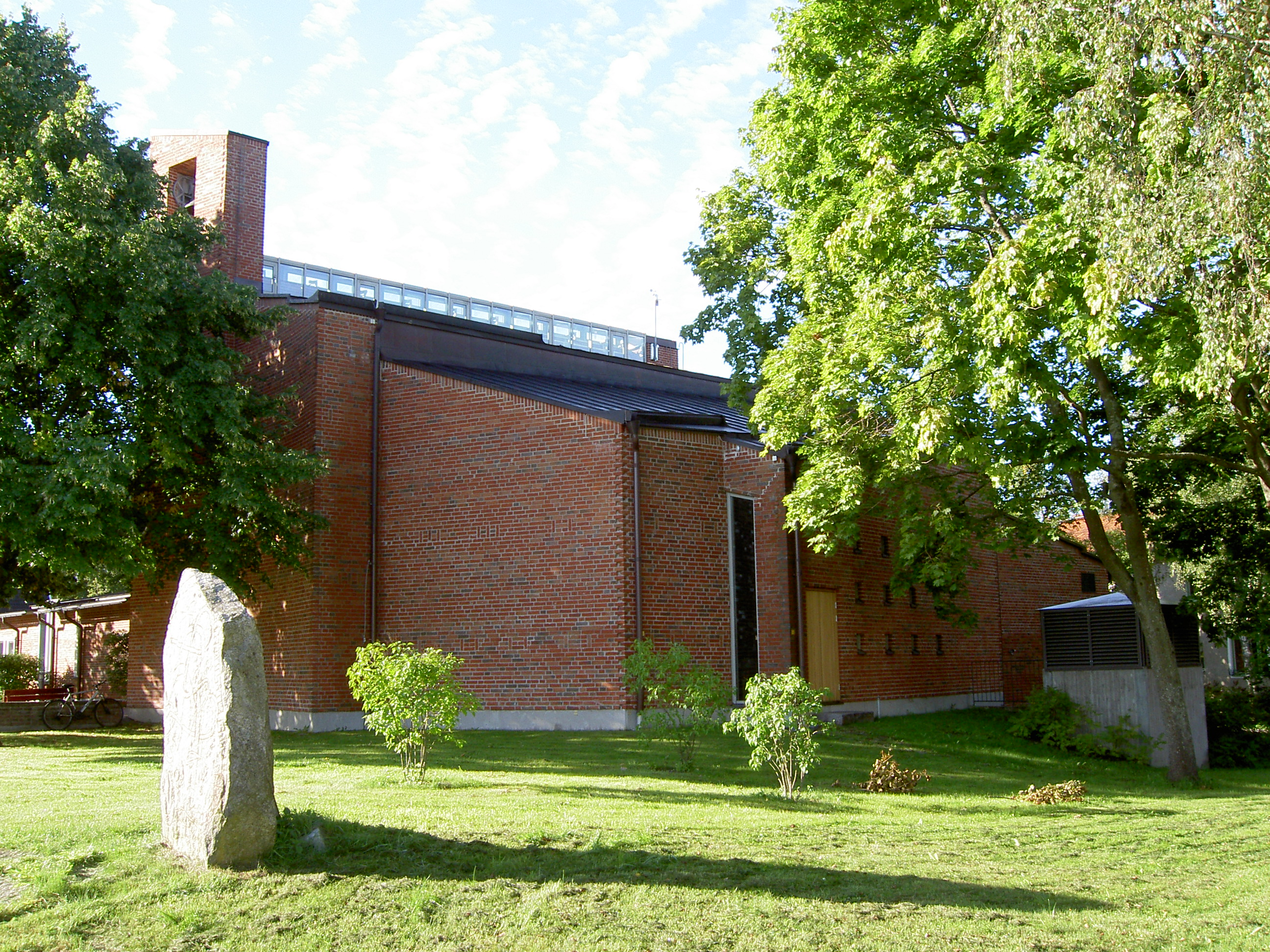
The runestone at the entrance to the Kummeby church.

=== Transliteration of the runes into Latin characters ===
elka ' lit raisa stain ' eftiʀ ' sua=rtik ' b... ... ... -t ' eystain ' uk ' at ' emink ' suni ÷ sina ' in ' ikulfastr

=== Transcription into Old Norse ===
Hælga let ræisa stæin æftiʀ Sværting, b[onda] ... ... [a]t Øystæin/Æistæin ok at Hæming, syni sina. En Igulfastr [risti].

=== Translation in English ===
Helga had the stone raised in memory of Svertingr, (her) husbandman ... ... in memory of Eysteinn and in memory of Hemingr, her sons. And Ígulfastr carved.

== See also ==
- List of runestones
