= U-231 =

U-231 may refer to:

- Uranium-231 (U-231 or ^{231}U), an isotope of uranium
- German submarine U-231 of World War II
- U 231, one of the Gällsta Runestones in Sweden
