= Vaksala Runestone =

Runestone

Coordinates: 59°52′42″N 17°40′58″E

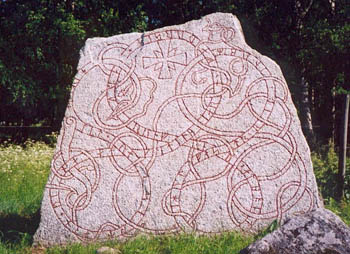
- Younger Futhark inscription on the Vaksala Runestone
- Created: eleventh century
- Discovered: Vaksala, Uppland, Sweden
- Rundata ID: U 961
- Runemaster: Öpir

The Vaksala Runestone, designated as U 961 under the Rundata catalog, is a Viking Age memorial runestone that is located close to Vaksala Church, near Uppsala, Sweden.

== Description ==
The Vaksala Runestone is one of the approximately forty runestones made by the successful runemaster Öpir, who signed this inscription and was active in the late eleventh and early twelfth century in Uppland. The inscription is classified as being in runestone style Pr4, which is also known as the Urnes style. This runestone style is characterized by slim and stylized animals that are interwoven into tight patterns. The animal heads are typically seen in profile with slender almond-shaped eyes and upwardly curled appendages on the noses and the necks. The runic inscription states that Ígulfastr arranged and Öpir carved the runestone on the behest of the widow and the daughter of the deceased. Ígulfastr is otherwise known from his signature on inscription U Fv1953;263 in Helenelund. Öpir was known for using loop patterns in his inscriptions, and used a three loop pattern for U 961. Other signed inscriptions where Öpir used a three loop pattern include U 142 in Fällbro, U 210 in Åsta, U 279 in Skälby, U 287 in Vik, U 566 in Vällingsö, U 687 in Sjusta, U 893 in Högby, U 898 in Norby, and U 1106 in Äskelunda.

The Vaksala Runestone was used as building material for the construction of a wall in the churchyard. Many runestones were used in the construction of buildings, roads, and bridges before their historical importance was understood. It has been removed from the wall and placed in its present location in the churchyard.

Of the personal names listed in the runic inscription, Ketilbjǫrn means "Kettle Bear" and Rúnfríðr combines Rún, a word which means "Secret" or "Mystery" and which is related in Old Norse to "rune" and "writing," and Fríðr, which means "Peace." The runic text is missing a possessive pronoun, the word "her" before "husbandman." Öpir is known to have left off pronouns in some of his other inscricriptions, such as U Fv1976;107 at the Uppsala Cathedral, U 984 in Ekeby, and U 993 in Brunnby.

== Inscription ==
h(u)(l)-a + lit + raisa stain + þina at kitilbiarn ' faþur ' sin + auk runfriþ ' at ' bonta ' auk ihulfastr ' riþ ' in ' ubiʀ
Hyl[i]a(?) {} lét {} reisa stein {} þenna at Ketilbjǫrn, {} fǫður {} sinn, {} ok Rúnfríðr {} at {} bónda, {} ok Ígulfastr {} réð, {} en {} Œpir.
Hylia(?) had this stone raised in memory of Ketilbjǫrn, his father; and Rúnfríðr in memory of (her) husbandman, and Ígulfastr arranged (it), and Œpir.

== See also ==
- List of runestones
- Runic alphabet
