= Staffan Ullström =

Swedish artist and wildlife rehabilitator

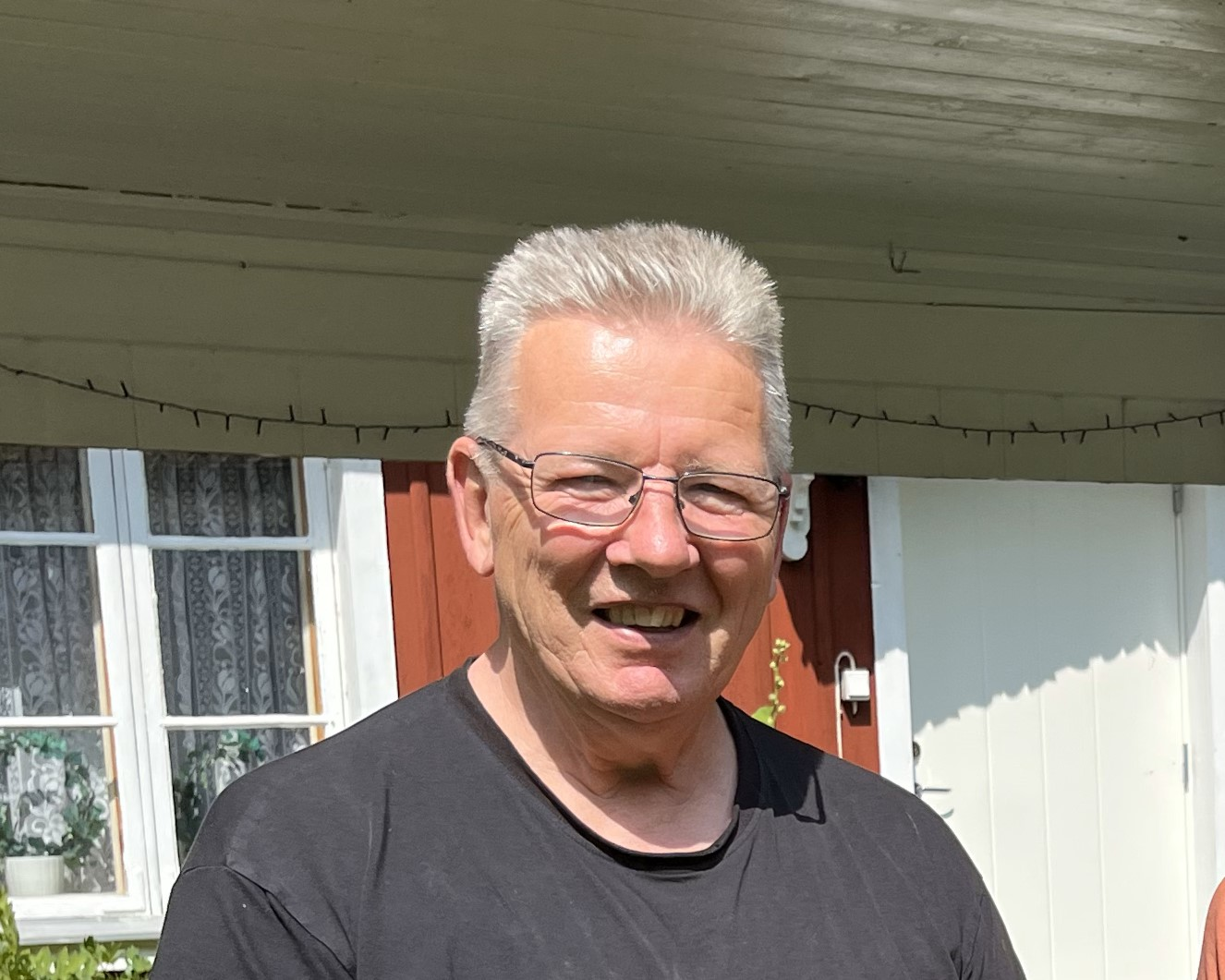
- Ullström in 2025
- Born: Tord Bjarne Staffan Ullström; 7 May 1949 (age 76); Alsike, Sweden
- Awards: Yellowhammer Award (2021)

Tord Bjarne Staffan Ullström (born 7 May 1949) is a Swedish artist, illustrator and wildlife rehabilitator.

== Early life ==
Ullström was born in Alsike, Sweden on 7 May 1949 and grew up in Knivsta. He began drawing as early as the age of three and developed an interest in animals, particularly birds, by the age of nine.

From the age of fifteen, he primarily created bird illustrations based on taxidermied specimens prepared by zoologist Hjalmar Fleischer.

== Career ==
Ullström is one of about 50 licensed wildlife rehabilitators in Sweden, specializing in birds but also occasionally caring for rabbits, squirrels, and hedgehogs. Since he started in 2002, over 750 birds has been rehabilitated by him by 2017.

In addition to his rehabilitation work, Ullström is an autodidact nature artist. He is best known for his detailed illustrations of birds and other wildlife, primarily in watercolour and pencil. His work is often produced in collaboration with scientists, and he has illustrated several popular nature books. His illustrations have also appeared in school textbooks and identification guides.

He has also illustrated over 30 postage stamps for both Sweden and Åland, featuring birds, mammals, and fungi. His stamp art is noted for its scientific accuracy and naturalistic style.

In 2022, Ullström received a 10,000 SEK grant from Närke Ornithological Society in recognition of his two decades of work with bird rehabilitation.

== Sources ==
- Nyblom (1980). Svenska konstnärer (in Swedish). Vänersborg: Vänersborgs Boktryckeri AB. ISBN 91-85040-31-2.
- Eremo, Maria (2017-12-14). ""När man ser dem flyga känns det bra i hjärtat"". Land (in Swedish).
- Isaksson, Sofie (2023-10-06). "Staffan tecknar och fångar fåglarnas alla detaljer". Länsposten (in Swedish).
- Ängtorp (2018). "Sveriges viltrehabiliterare". angtorpviltrehab.se (in Swedish).
- ArtSignatureDictionary (2021). "Staffan ULLSTRÖM, 1950, Sweden". artsignaturedictionary.com.
- Petersson, Johan (2023). "Staffan Ullström". khkonstantik.se (in Swedish).
- Halttunen, Kent (2022-09-21). "Staffan Ullström prisas för sitt arbete med Fågelakuten". nof.birdlife.se (in Swedish).
- NOF (2021). "Årets gulsparv 2021 – Staffan Ullström". nof.birdlife.se (in Swedish).
- Opal (2022). "Staffan Ullström". opal.se (in Swedish).
