= Uppland Runic Inscription 485 =

Coordinates: 59°46′54″N 17°50′13″E

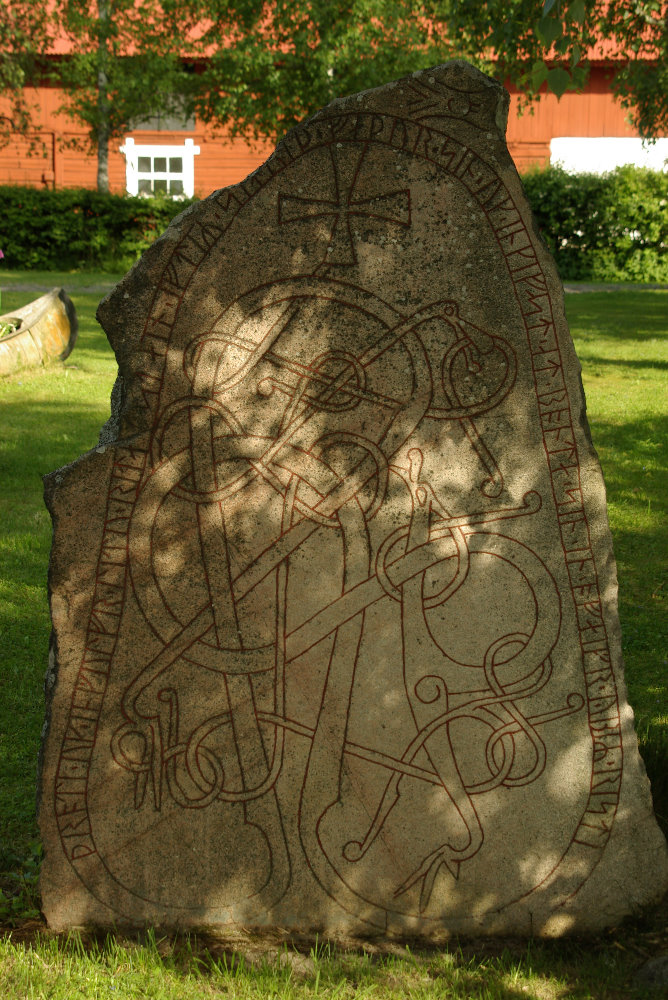
U 485 in Marma has a signature with the full name of the runemaster Öpir.

Uppland Runic Inscription 485 or U 485 is the Rundata catalog number for a Viking Age memorial runestone that is located in Marma, which is about six kilometers northeast of Knivsta, Uppsala County, Sweden, which was in the historic province of Uppland.

== Description ==
This inscription consists of runic text in the younger futhark carved on a serpent or lindworm that circles a central area where it then becomes intertwined with a ribbon beast in the center. A Christian cross is near the top of the inscription. The granite runestone, which is 1.8 meters in height, was placed on its current base in 1925. It is classified as being carved in runestone style Pr5, which is also known as Urnes style. This runestone style is characterized by slim and stylized animals that are interwoven into tight patterns. The animal heads are typically seen in profile with slender almond-shaped eyes and upwardly curled appendages on the noses and the necks. This stone is considered to be a good example of an inscription in style Pr5.

The inscription is signed with the runes ofaigr ybiʀ by the runemaster Öpir, who was active in the Uppland area in the late 11th and early 12th centuries. The first word in Old Norse is Ofæigʀ, which combines a negative prefix ó with feigr to mean "death bound" or "fated to die" but without any negative connotations intended, thus making a name meaning "Not Doomed." This is the only runic inscription of Öpir with this first name, and it has been suggested that this was the given name of Öpir. The name he used in his other surviving signed inscriptions was the sobriquet or nickname Öpir, which means "Shouter."

The runic text states that the stone was raised by two brothers named Þrótti and Ingulfr as a memorial to their father Sigviðr and by a woman named Ingifastr to her husbandman. The name Ingifastr was carved in runes as inkifa=st, which uses a bind rune to combine an a-rune and an s-rune. Another inscription which used a bind rune to combine these same two runes, which was also signed by Öpir, is the Varangian runestone Sö 308 from Vid Järnavägen. Bind runes appear disproportionately in names in runic texts, and it has been suggested that they may have been sometimes used to draw attention to a name, similar to the way that initial capital letters are used to start names in European languages today.

== Inscription ==
=== Transliteration of the runes into Latin characters ===
þroti ' uk ' ingulfr ' litu ' rita stain ' iftiʀ ' sihuiþ ' faþur ' sin ' uk ' inkifa=st ' at ' bonta ' sin ' in ' ofaigr ' ybiʀ ' risti

=== Transcription into Old Norse ===
Þrotti ok Ingulfʀ letu retta stæin æftiʀ Sigvið, faður sinn, ok Ingifast at bonda sinn. En Ofæigʀ/ofæigʀ Øpiʀ risti.

=== Translation in English ===
Þrótti and Ingulfr had the stone erected in memory of Sigviðr, their father; and Ingifastr in memory of her husbandman. And Ófeigr / the not doomed Öpir carved.

== See also ==
- List of runestones
