= Uppland Runic Inscription Fv1948;168 =

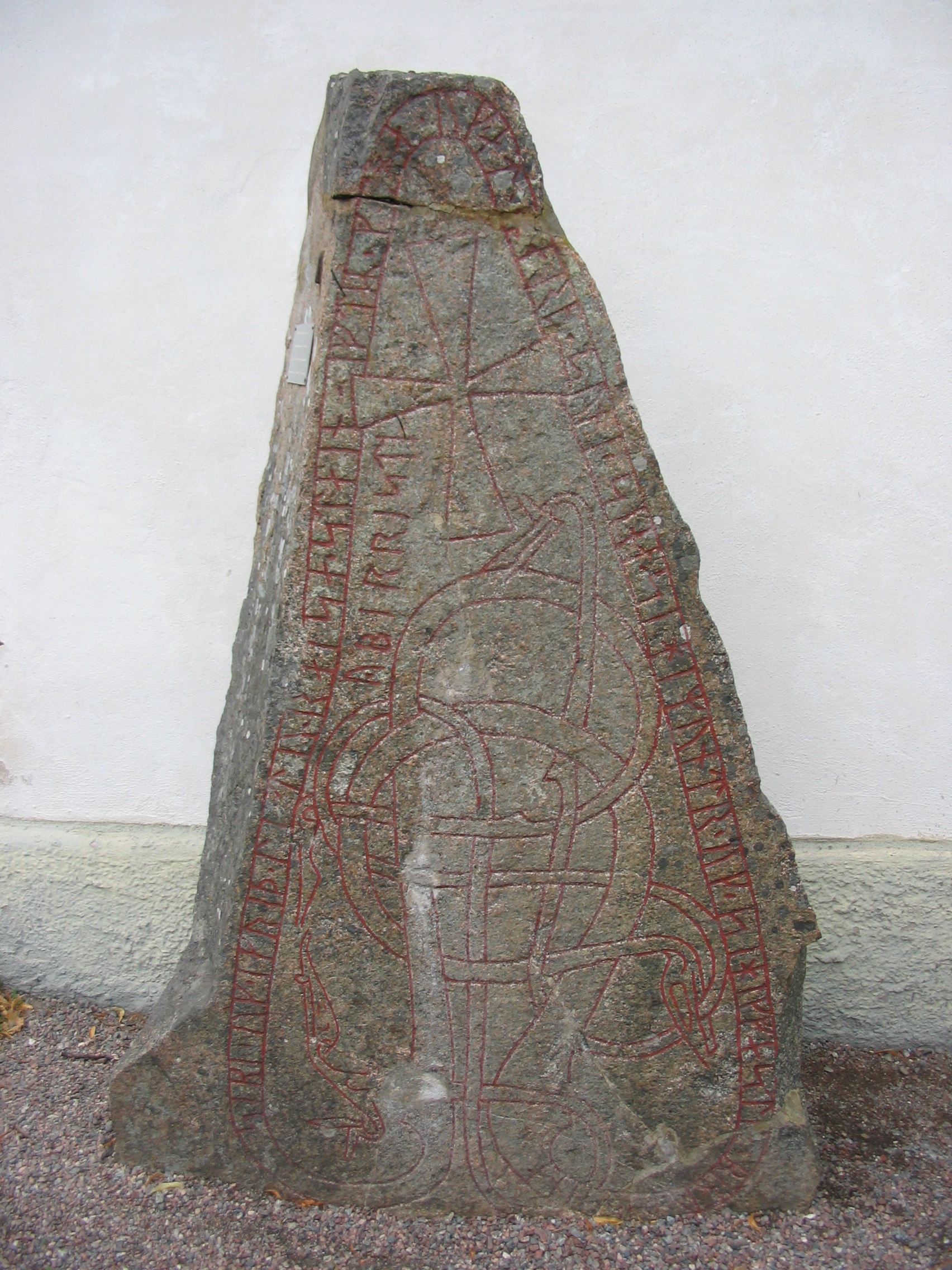
Runic inscription U Fv1948;168 is located at the church in Alsike, Uppland, Sweden.

This runic inscription, designated as U Fv1948;168 in the Rundata catalog, is on a Viking Age memorial runestone to two sons that is located in Alsike, Uppsala County, Sweden, which is in the historic province of Uppland.

== Description ==
This runestone was discovered on December 5, 1947 during restoration work at the church in Alsike. Before the historic significance of runestones was understood, they were often reused as materials in the construction of buildings, roads, and bridges. The stone was repaired and raised next to the church in 1948. The inscription on this granite stone, which is 1.9 meters in height, consists of runic text in the younger futhark carved on a serpent that is intertwined in an intricate design. In the upper center of the design is a Christian cross. The inscription is classified as being carved in runestone style Pr5, which is also known as Urnes style. This runestone style is characterized by slim and stylized animals that are interwoven into tight patterns. The animal heads are typically seen in profile with slender almond-shaped eyes and upwardly curled appendages on the noses and the necks.

The runic text states that the stone was raised by the parents and two brothers in memory of Gagi and Harðr. The father's name Sibbi is likely a nickname, and, based upon the names of two of the two sons, Sigmundr and Sigfastr, may be short for Sigbjórn. A common practice at that time in Scandinavia was the repeating one of the name elements from a parent's name in the names of the children to show the family connection. The inscription is signed by the runemaster Öpir, who was active during the late 11th century and early 12th century in Uppland. His signature, ybir risti or Øpiʀ risti ("Œpir carved"), is separated from the rest of the runic text and is located on the left side of the inscription, inside of the serpent, and under the cross. His style is sufficiently distinctive that this inscription would have been attributed to him even without his signature being present.

The Rundata designation for this Uppland inscription, U Fv1948;168, refers to the year and page number of the issue of Fornvännen in which the runestone was first described.

== Inscription ==
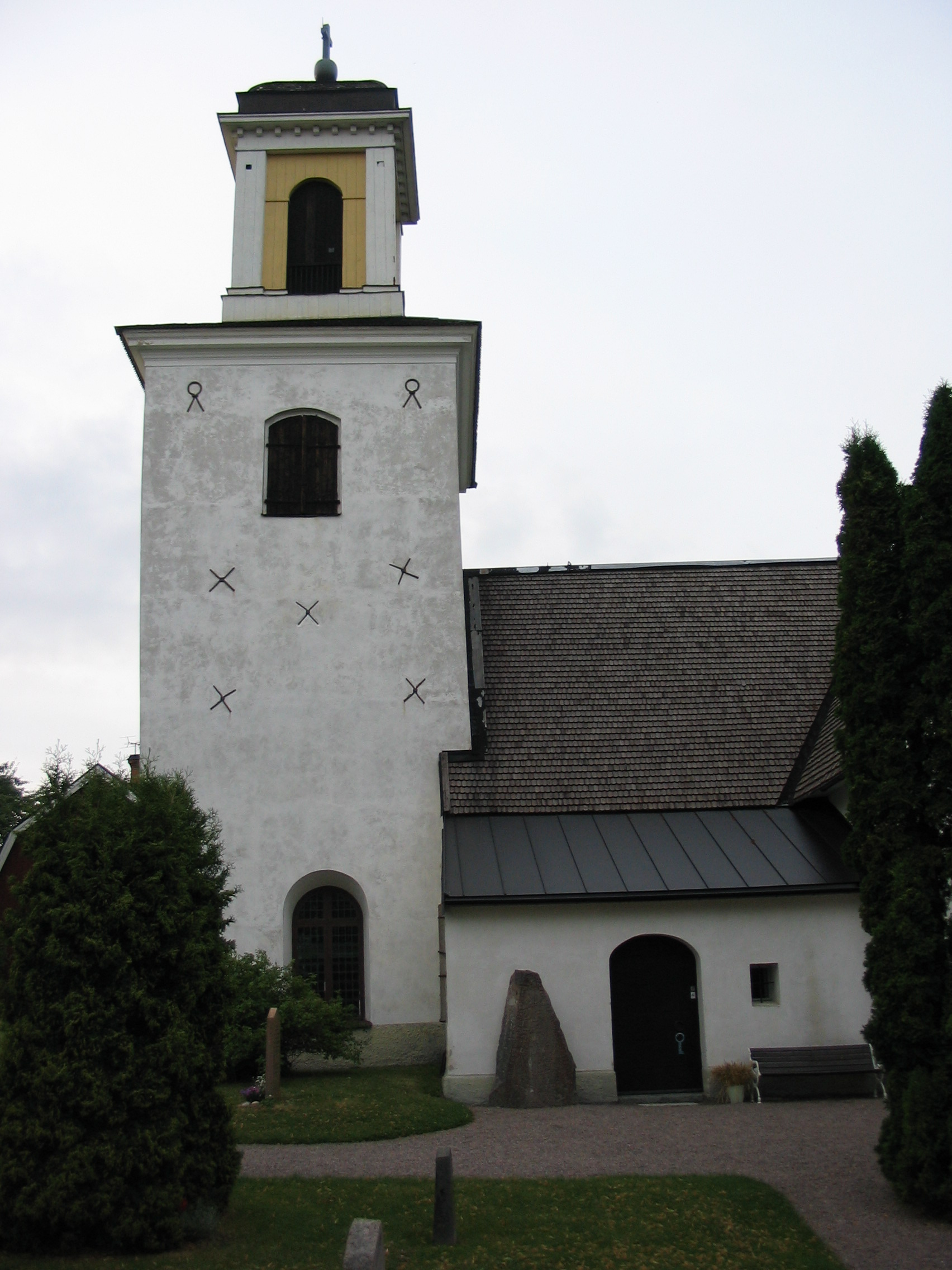
The church and runestone.

=== Transliteration of the runes into Latin characters ===
sibi * uk * ikriþ * litu * raisa * stain * iftiʀ * g-ha * uk * at * harþ * suni * sina * sihimuntr * uk * sihikfastr * bryþr * sina ybir risti

=== Transcription into Old Norse ===
Sibbi ok Ingrið letu ræisa stæin æftiʀ G[a]ga(?) ok at Harð, syni sina, Sigmundr ok Sigfastr [at] brøðr sina. Øpiʀ risti.

=== Translation in English ===
Sibbi and Ingríðr had the stone raised in memory of Gagi(?) and in memory of Harðr, their sons; Sigmundr and Sigfastr in memory of their brothers. Œpir carved.

== See also ==
- List of runestones
