= Södermanland Runic Inscription 328 =

Coordinates: 59°22′39″N 17°03′30″E

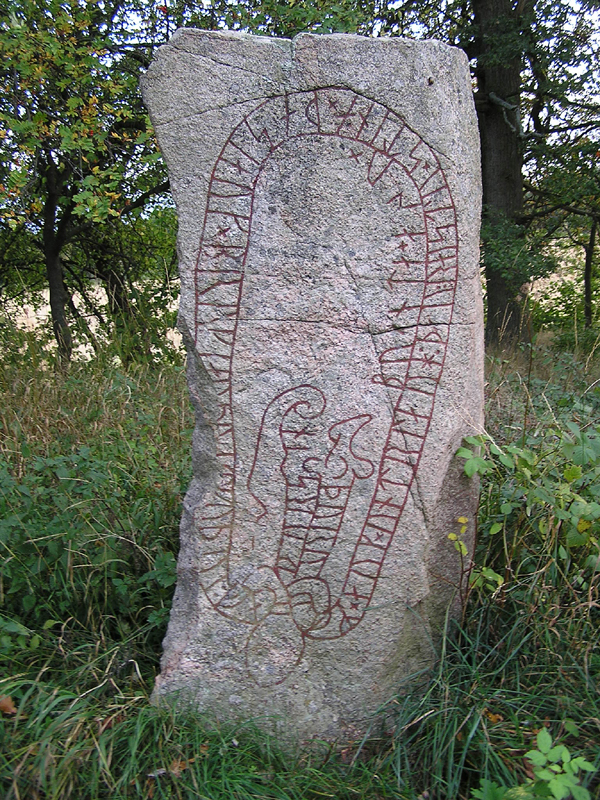
Sö 328 is located in Tynäs, Södermanland, Sweden.

Sö 328 is the Rundata catalog number for a runic inscription on a Viking Age memorial runestone which is located in Tynäs, which is about one kilometer east of Strängnäs, Södermanland County, Sweden, which is in the historic province of Södermanland.

== Description ==
This runic inscription consists of runic text in the younger futhark that is carved on a serpent that circles the face of the granite stone, which is 1.7 meters in height. The tail and head of the serpent are bound as if restrained to the surface of the stone. The stone was discovered in 1913 on a small hill and was raised at approximately the same location, which is believed to be its original location. The inscription is classified as being carved in runestone style Pr2, which is also known as Ringerike style. This is the classification for inscriptions where the text bars end with serpent or beast heads depicted as seen in profile.

The runic text, which begins at the serpent's head, states that the stone and a bridge was made to memorialize the father of Þórulfr and Undrlaug. This stone is similar to many other runestones of this period that refer to bridge building. Some are Christian references related to passing the bridge into the afterlife. At this time, the Catholic Church sponsored the building of roads and bridges through the use of indulgences in return for the church's intercession for the soul of the departed. There are over one hundred examples of bridge stones that have been dated from the eleventh century, including runic inscriptions Sö 101 in Ramsund, Sö 141 in Löta, Sö 312 in Gamla Turingevägen, U 69 in Eggeby, and U 489 in Morby. The text also refers to the raising of steina, or "stones," indicating that Þórulfr and Undrlaug raised more than one stone in memory of their father. The other stone that was part of the monument, however, has been lost. The final portion of the runic text, buanta × asu × or bónda Ásu ("Ása's husbandman"), is written inside of the serpent on the right side of the inscription.

The name Undrlaug is somewhat unusual, and appears only on one other runestone, Sö 280 at the Strängnäs Cathedral in Södermanland. This lead one runologist to suggest that the two runestones refer to the same woman, however, there is no evidence to support this other than the name being the same on both stones.

== Inscription ==
=== Transliteration of the runes into Latin characters ===
þurulfʀ × auk × untrlauh : þau : raistu × stina × þasi auk × bru × kia(r)(þ)(u) -(t) (k)u(þ)ui × faþur : sin buanta × asu ×

=== Transcription into Old Norse ===
Þórulfr ok Undrlaug þau reistu steina þessa ok brú gerðu [a]t Guðvé, fôður sinn, bónda Ásu.

=== Translation in English ===
Þórulfr and Undrlaug, they raised these stones and made the bridge in memory of Guðvér, their father, Ása's husbandman.

== Photographs ==
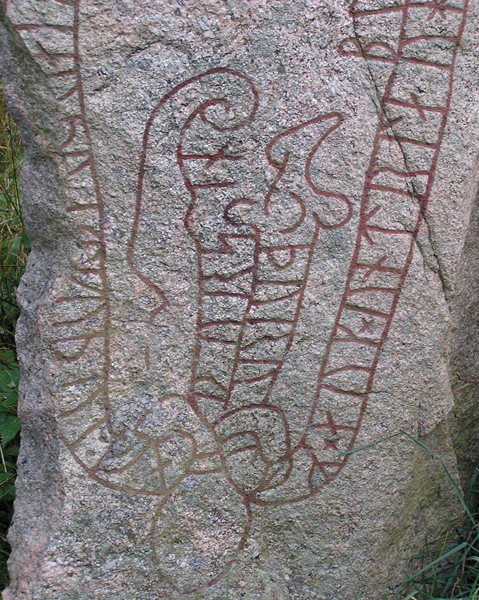
The head and tail of the serpent are bound to the stone.

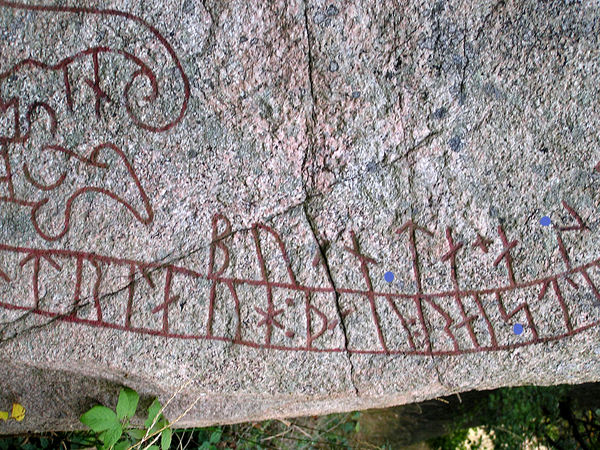
Detail showing text written outside of the serpent.
