= Uppland Runic Inscription 541 =

Coordinates: 59°44′25″N 18°31′48″E

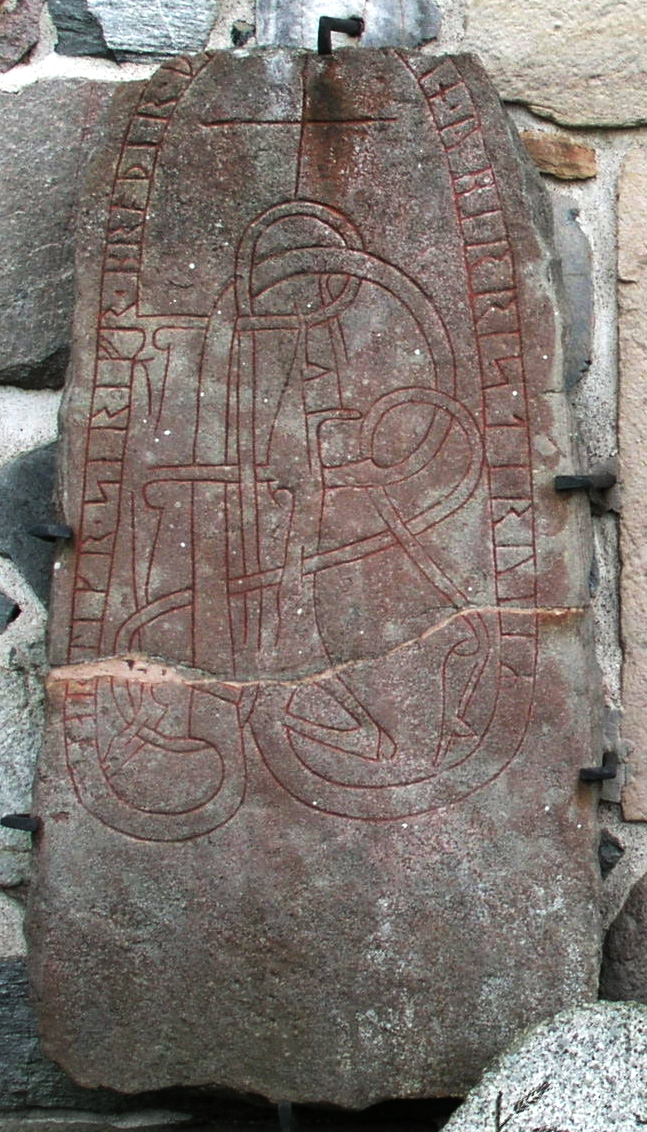
U 541 displayed at the Husby-Sjuhundra church (formally known as the Husby-Lyhundra church).

Uppland Runic Inscription 541 or U 541 is the Rundata catalog listing for a Viking Age memorial runestone which is located at the Husby-Sjuhundra church, which is five kilometers west of Norrtälje, Stockholm County, Sweden, and in the historic province of Uppland. The inscription is signed by the runemaster Öpir.

== Description ==
The inscription on U 541 consists of runic text in the younger futhark that is carved on a serpent that follows the edge of the stone, which is made of sandstone and is 1.45 meters in height, and then becomes entangled in the center. A cross is near the top of the inscription. It is classified as being carved in runestone style Pr5, which is also known as Urnes style. This runestone style is characterized by slim and stylized animals that are interwoven into tight patterns. The animal heads are typically seen in profile with slender almond-shaped eyes and upwardly curled appendages on the noses and the necks. This stone is considered to be an excellent representative of an inscription in style Pr5. The text indicates that the inscription was carved by the runemaster with the normalized name of Öpir, who was active in Uppland in the late 11th and early 12th centuries. The stone is not in its original position, but was noted as being part of the church during a survey of runestones in the 1800s. Before the historic significance of runestones was understood, they were often reused as materials in the construction of churches, walls, and roads. In 1887, the parishioners decided to extract U 541 and a second stone, U 540, from the church and, with financial help provided by the Royal Swedish Academy of Letters, History and Antiquities, both stones were removed and attached outside the church's northern wall.

The runic text does not follow the memorial formula typically used in runestones carved in the late Viking Age, but states "here lies" followed by the name Sigreifr or Særeifr, who was the brother of the unnamed sponsor of the stone. The use of "here lies" indicates that the stone originally stood over the grave of the deceased, perhaps in a consecrated graveyard since there is a cross on the inscription. It has been noted that the phrase "here lies" is a direct translation of the Latin phrase "HIC IACET" that was often used on medieval graves and followed by the name of the deceased. Another Viking Age runestone with an inscription that begins with this phrase is U 559 in Malsta. The inscription was signed by the runemaster Öpir using the Old Norse phrase en Øpiʀ risti runaʀ, which means "and Öpir carved the runes." This exact phrase was also used by Öpir when signing inscriptions on U 118 in Älvsunda, U 181 in Össeby-Garns, the now-lost U 262 in Fresta, U 287 in Vik, U 462 in Prästgården, and U 566 in Vällingsö.

== Inscription ==
=== Transliteration of the runes into Latin characters ===
iar likr ' serifr ' broþir ' þ-... ... in ' ybir risti ru-iʀ

=== Transcription into Old Norse ===
Hiar liggʀ Sigræifʀ/Særæifʀ, broðiʀ ... ... En Øpiʀ risti ru[n]iʀ.

=== Translation in English ===
Here lies Sigreifr/Særeifr, brother ... ... And Öpir carved the runes.

== See also ==
- List of runestones
