= Uppland Runic Inscription 1014 =

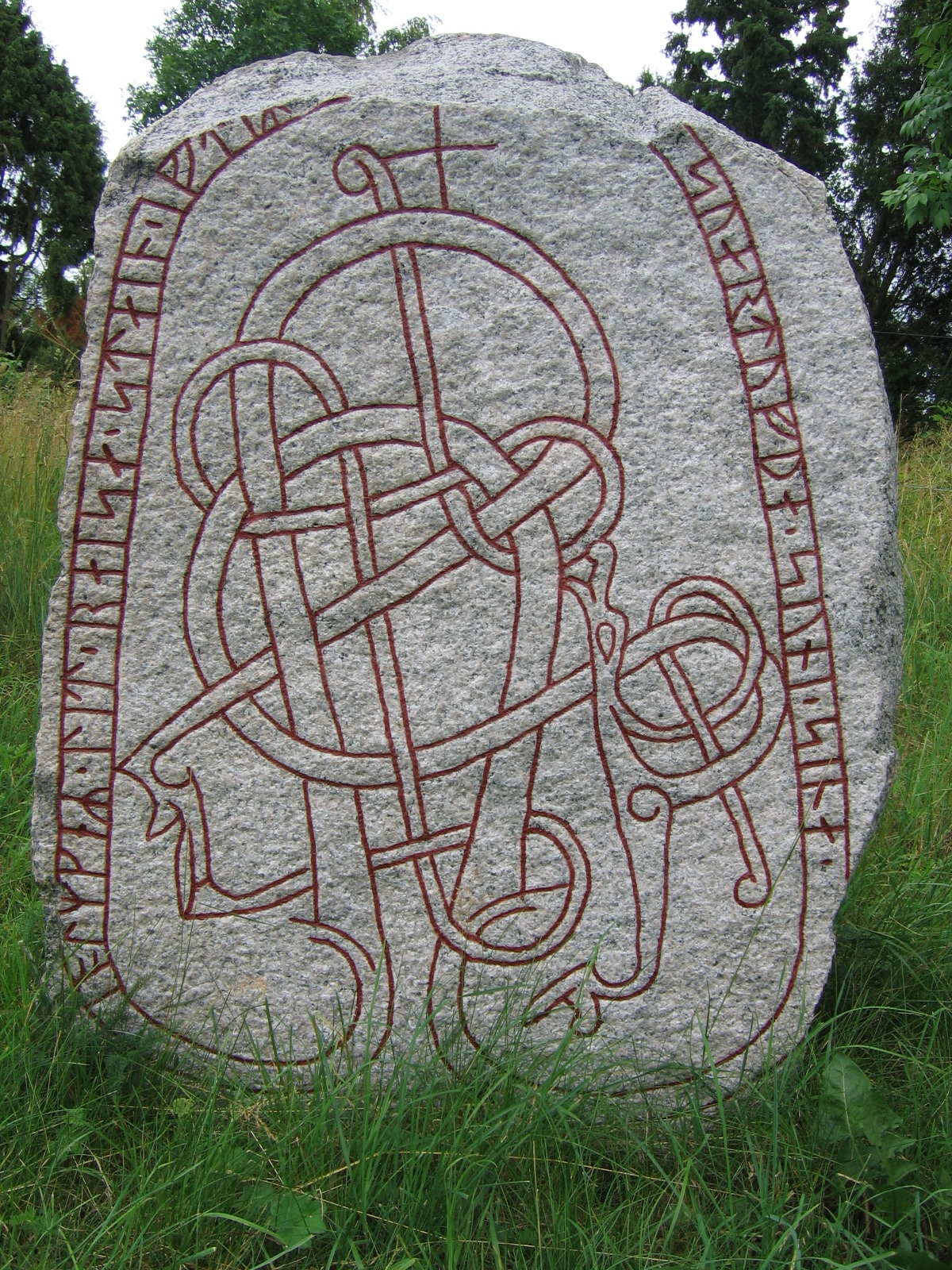
The Urnes style animal on runestone U 1014.

U 1014 is the Rundata designation for a Viking Age memorial runestone that is located in Ärentuna, which is about one kilometer east of Lövstalöt, Uppland, Sweden.

== Description ==
This runic inscription consists of runic text carved on a serpent that circles a center where the serpent's head and tail are intertwined. A small Christian cross is in the upper part of the design. The runestone is 1.01 meters in height and made of gneiss. The inscription for stylistic reasons has been attributed to the runemaster Öpir, who was active in the Uppland area in the late 11th or early 12th century. It has its runic inscription around an intricate animal design and is carved in runestone style Pr5, also known as the Urnes style. This runestone style is characterized by slim and stylized animals that are interwoven into tight patterns. The animal heads are typically seen in profile with slender almond-shaped eyes and upwardly curled appendages on the noses and the necks.

The runic text states that a man named either Holmgeirr or Hjalmgeirr raised the stone as a memorial to his two sons, Ígulfastr and Svarthǫfði. The name Svarthǫfði translates as "Black Head," and was often used as a nickname.

== Inscription ==
=== Transliteration of the runes into Latin characters ===
iolmkeʀ ' lit ' raisa ' stain ' ifti[ʀ ' iulfast ' uk '] suartufþa ' suni ' sina

=== Transcription into Old Norse ===
Holmgeirr/Hjalmgeirr lét reisa stein eptir Ígulfast(?) ok Svarth]ǫfða, sonu sína.

=== Translation in English ===
Holmgeirr/Hjalmgeirr had the stone raised in memory of Ígulfastr(?) and Svarthǫfði, his sons.

== See also ==
- List of runestones
