= Uppland Runic Inscription 181 =

Coordinates: 59°33′45″N 18°15′11″E

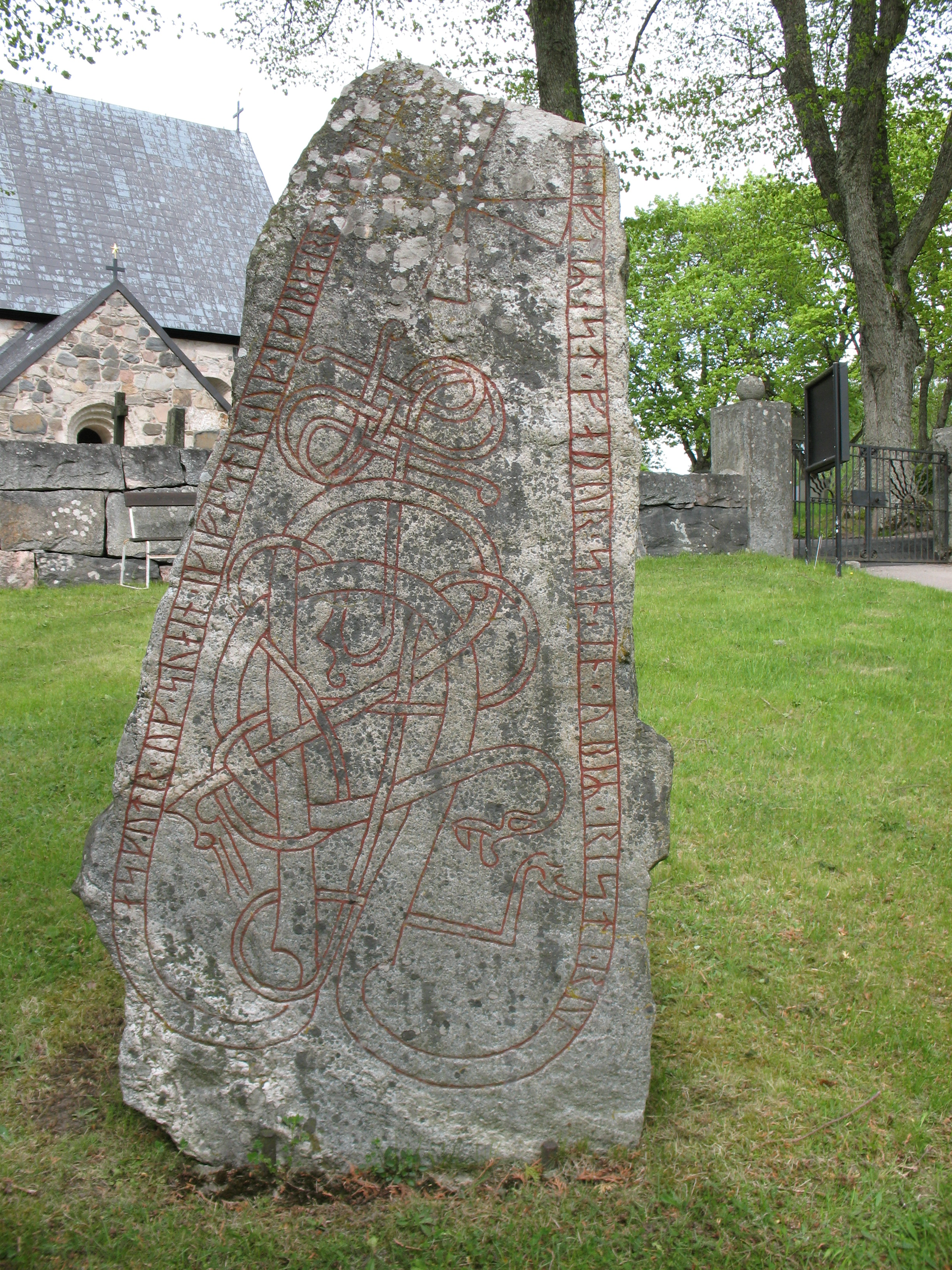
U 181 located at Össeby-Garn.

Uppland Runic Inscription 181 or U 181 is the Rundata catalog number for a Viking Age memorial runestone located at Össeby-Garn, which is about one kilometer east of Karby, Uppsala County, Sweden.

== Description ==
This inscription on a granite stone, which is 1.85 meters in height, consists of runic text in the younger futhark that is carved on a serpent that circles a central area where it becomes intertwined with itself, with a Christian cross in the upper part of the encircled area. The inscription is classified as being carved in runestone style Pr5, which is considered to be Urnes style. This runestone style is characterized by slim and stylized animals that are interwoven into tight patterns. The animal heads are typically seen in profile with slender almond-shaped eyes and upwardly curled appendages on the noses and the necks. The text indicates that the inscription was carved by the runemaster Öpir, who was active during the late 11th century and early 12th century in Uppland, Sweden. His name ubiʀ is on the serpent on the lower right of this inscription. Öpir is known for his Urnes style inscriptions and signed almost fifty surviving inscriptions, with many more unsigned inscriptions attributed to him. Runic inscriptions are often dated based upon comparative linguistic and stylistic analysis, and the inscription on U 181 has been dated as being carved approximately after 1100.

The runic text indicates that the stone was raised by several brothers and possibly daughters as a memorial to their father named Eistr. In carving the text, Öpir left off the final "ʀ" in runaʀ, or "runes," which he also did on inscriptions such as that on U Fv1976;107 at Uppsala Cathedral. Öpir also used a dot as a punctuation mark between each word of the text of this inscription. The inscription was signed by the runemaster Öpir using the Old Norse phrase en Øpiʀ risti runaʀ, which means "and Öpir carved the runes." This exact phrase was also used by Öpir when signing inscriptions on U 118 in Älvsunda, the now-lost U 262 in Fresta, U 287 in Vik, U 462 in Prästgården, U 541 in Husby-Sjuhundra, and U 566 in Vällingsö.

== Inscription ==
=== Transliteration of the runes into Latin characters ===
askutr ' uk ' suain ' ikifastr ' uk ' ikibiarn ' uk ' tutr ' ... ...ain ' iftiʀ ' est ' faþur ' sin ' in ' ubiʀ ' risti ' run

=== Transcription into Old Norse ===
Asgautr ok Svæinn, Ingifastr ok Ingibiorn ok døtr(?)/Dyntr(?) ... [st]æin æftiʀ Æist, faður sinn. En Øpiʀ risti runaʀ.

=== Translation in English ===
Ásgautr and Sveinn (and) Ingifastr and Ingibjǫrn and the daughters(?)/Dyntr(?) ... the stone in memory of Eistr, their father. And Œpir carved the runes.

== See also ==
- List of runestones
