= Uppland Runic Inscription 210 =

Coordinates: 59.5358°N 18.1445°E

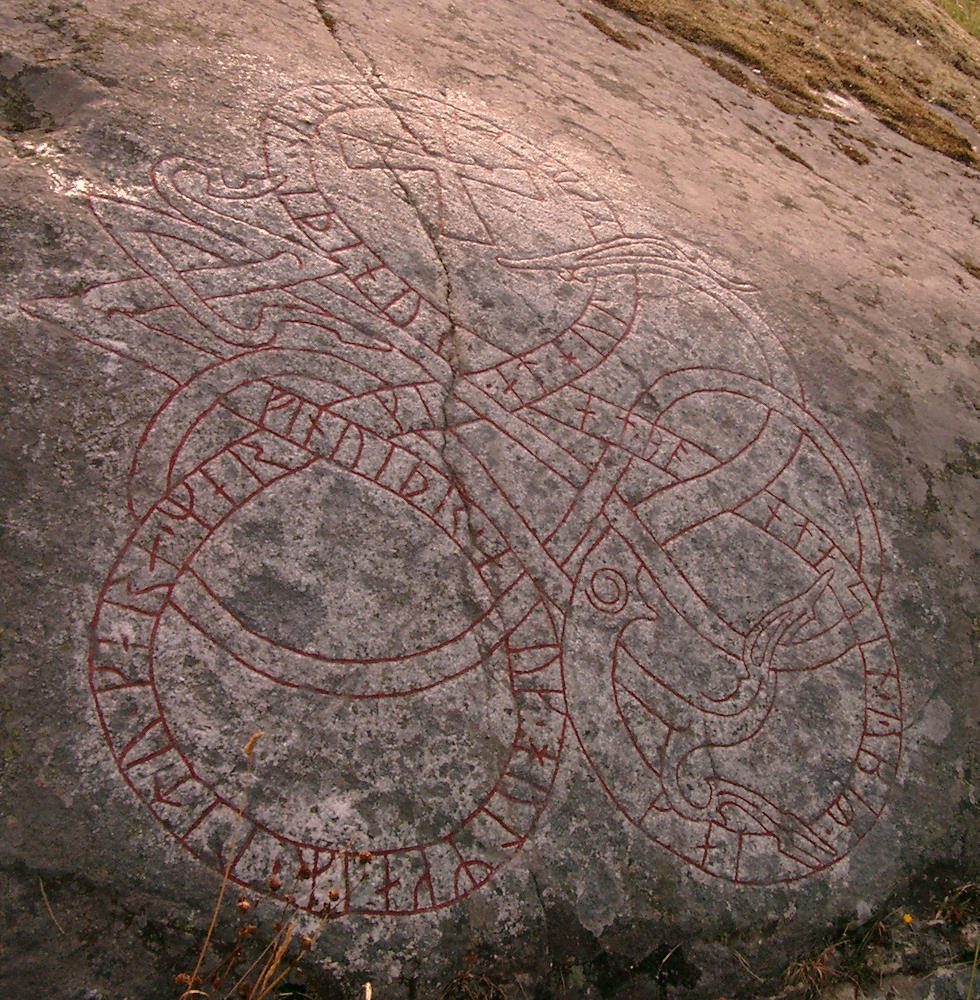
U 210 is carved on a rockface in Åsta.

Uppland Runic Inscription 210 or U 210 is the Rundata catalog listing for a Viking Age memorial runic inscription which is carved on a rock-face that is located in Åsta, which is three kilometers east of Vallentuna, Stockholm County, Sweden, and in the historic province of Uppland. The inscription is signed by the runemaster Öpir.

== Description ==
The inscription on U 210 consists of runic text in the younger futhark that is carved on a serpent that makes three loops and with a cross located in the upper loop. The inscription, which measures 1.5 meters tall by 1.3 meters broad, is classified as being carved in runestone style Pr4, which is also known as Urnes style. This runestone style is characterized by slim and stylized animals that are interwoven into tight patterns. The animal heads are typically seen in profile with slender almond-shaped eyes and upwardly curled appendages on the noses and the necks. U 210 was described by one runic scholar as being a "good example" of a Pr4 style inscription. The runic text indicates that the inscription was carved by a runemaster with a normalized name of Öpir, who was active in Uppland in the late 11th and early 12th centuries. Öpir was known for using loop patterns in his inscriptions, and used a three loop pattern for U 210. Other signed inscriptions where Öpir used a three loop pattern include U 142 in Fällbro, U 279 in Skälby, U 287 in Vik, U 566 in Vällingsö, U 687 in Sjusta, U 893 in Högby, U 898 in Norby, U 961 in Vaksala, and U 1106 in Äskelunda.

The runic text states that the inscription was sponsored by two brothers named Finnviðr and Holmgeirr and their mother Heðinvé in memory of their father Holmgautr. The inscription is signed by Öpir using the runes ybiʀ ' iak ("Œpir cut"), which he also used on the now-lost runestone U 168 in Björkeby.

== Inscription ==
=== Transliteration of the runes into Latin characters ===
finuiþr ' auk ' hulmkaiʀ ' litu ' kera ' merki ÷ at ÷ hulmkut ' faþur ÷ sin ÷ iþinui ' at ' bonta sin ' ybiʀ ' iak

=== Transcription into Old Norse ===
Finnviðr ok Holmgæiʀʀ letu gærva mærki at Holmgaut, faður sinn, Heðinvi at bonda sinn. Øpiʀ hiogg.

=== Translation in English ===
Finnviðr and Holmgeirr had the landmark made in memory of Holmgautr, their father; Heðinvé in memory of her husbandman. Œpir cut.

== See also ==
- List of runestones
