= Uppland Runic Inscription 839 =

Coordinates: 59°45′08″N 17°08′45″E

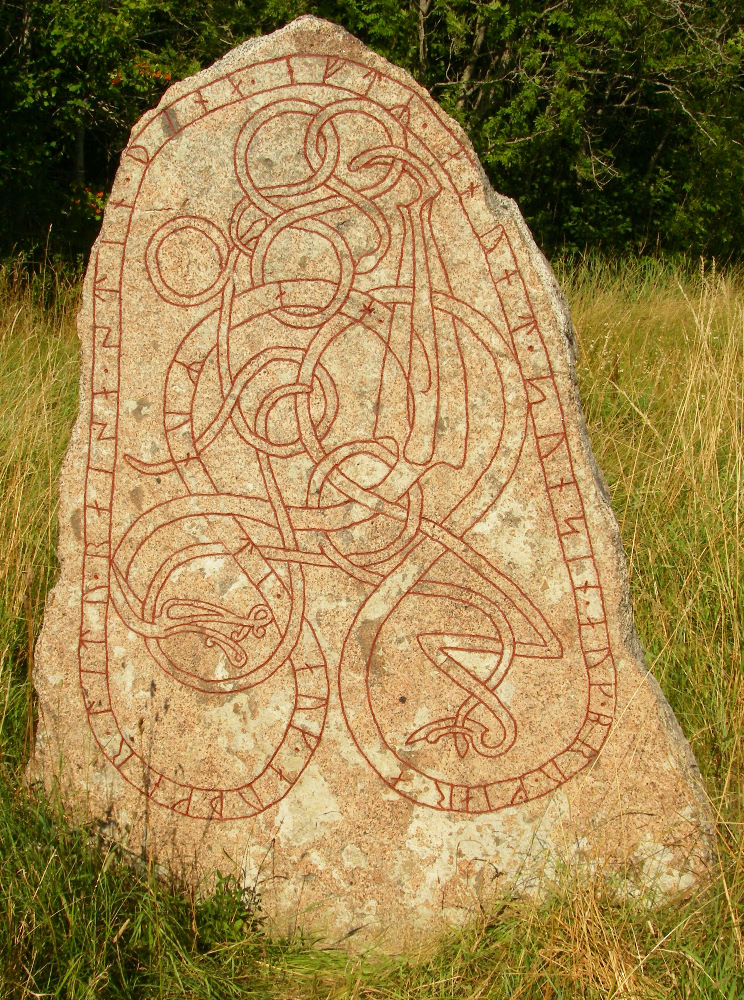
Runestone U 839 is located in Ryda kungsgård, Uppland, Sweden.

This runic inscription, designated as U 839 in the Rundata catalog, is on a Viking Age memorial runestone located in Ryda kungsgård, which is about 6 kilometers north of Enköping, Uppsala County, Sweden, and in the historic province of Uppland.

== Description ==
The design on this stone has the runic text inscribed within a serpent band. The stone is granite and is 2.25 meters in height. The inscription has been attributed to a runemaster named Torgöt Fotsarve, who on the signed runestone U 308 describes himself as the son of the runemaster Fot. Other inscriptions signed by Torgöt include U 746 in Hårby and U 958 in Villinge. This inscription is classified as being carved in runestone style Pr4, which is also known as Urnes style. This runestone style is characterized by slim and stylized animals that are interwoven into tight patterns. The animal heads are typically seen in profile with slender almond-shaped eyes and upwardly curled appendages on the noses and the necks.

The runic text is in the younger futhark and states that Ámundi and Auðgerðr raised the stone and had a bridge made as a memorial to their son Ǫnundr. The reference to bridge-building is fairly common in runestones during this time period. Some are Christian references related to passing the bridge into the afterlife. At this time, the Catholic Church sponsored the building of roads and bridges through a practice similar to the use of indulgences in return for the church's intercession for the soul of the departed. There are many examples of these bridge stones dated from the eleventh century, including runic inscriptions Sö 101 in Ramsundsberget, U 489 in Morby, and U 617 at Bro.

The name of the woman in the inscription, Auðgerðr or Ödgärd, is also mentioned on another memorial runestone, U 821, which is located in Mysinge, Uppland. As U 821 is located approximately two miles from U 839, it is possible that both runestones refer to the same woman, although there is no other evidence of this besides the same name being used in the text.

== Inscription ==
=== Runic text ===
The text "ᚼᛅᛉᚢᚾᛏᛁ᛫ᛅᚢᚴᚽᚱ᛫ᛚᛁᛏᚢ᛫ᚱᛅᛁᛋᛅ᛫ᛋᛏᛁᚾ᛫ᚦᛁᚾᛅ᛫ᚽᛓᛏᛣ᛫ᛅᚾᚢᚾᛏ᛫ᛋᚢᚾᛋᛁᚾ᛫ᛅᚢᚴ᛫ᛒᚱᚢ᛫ᚵᛁᛅᚱᛅ".

ᚼᛅᛉᚢᚾᛏᛁ᛫ᛅᚢᚴᚽᚱ᛫ᛚᛁᛏᚢ᛫ᚱᛅᛁᛋᛅ᛫ᛋᛏᛁᚾ᛫ᚦᛁᚾᛅ᛫ᚽᛓᛏᛣ᛫ᛅᚾᚢᚾᛏ᛫ᛋᚢᚾᛋᛁᚾ᛫ᛅᚢᚴ᛫ᛒᚱᚢ᛫ᚵᛁᛅᚱᛅ

=== Transliteration of the runes into Latin characters ===
* hamunti * auk * auþker * litu * raisa * stin * þina * eftʀ * anunt * sun sin * auk * bru * giara

=== Transcription into Old Norse ===
Ámundi ok Auðgerðr létu reisa stein þenna eptir Ǫnund, son sinn, ok brú gera.

=== Translation in English ===
Ámundi and Auðgerðr had this stone raised and the bridge made in memory of Ǫnundr, their son.

== See also ==
- List of runestones
