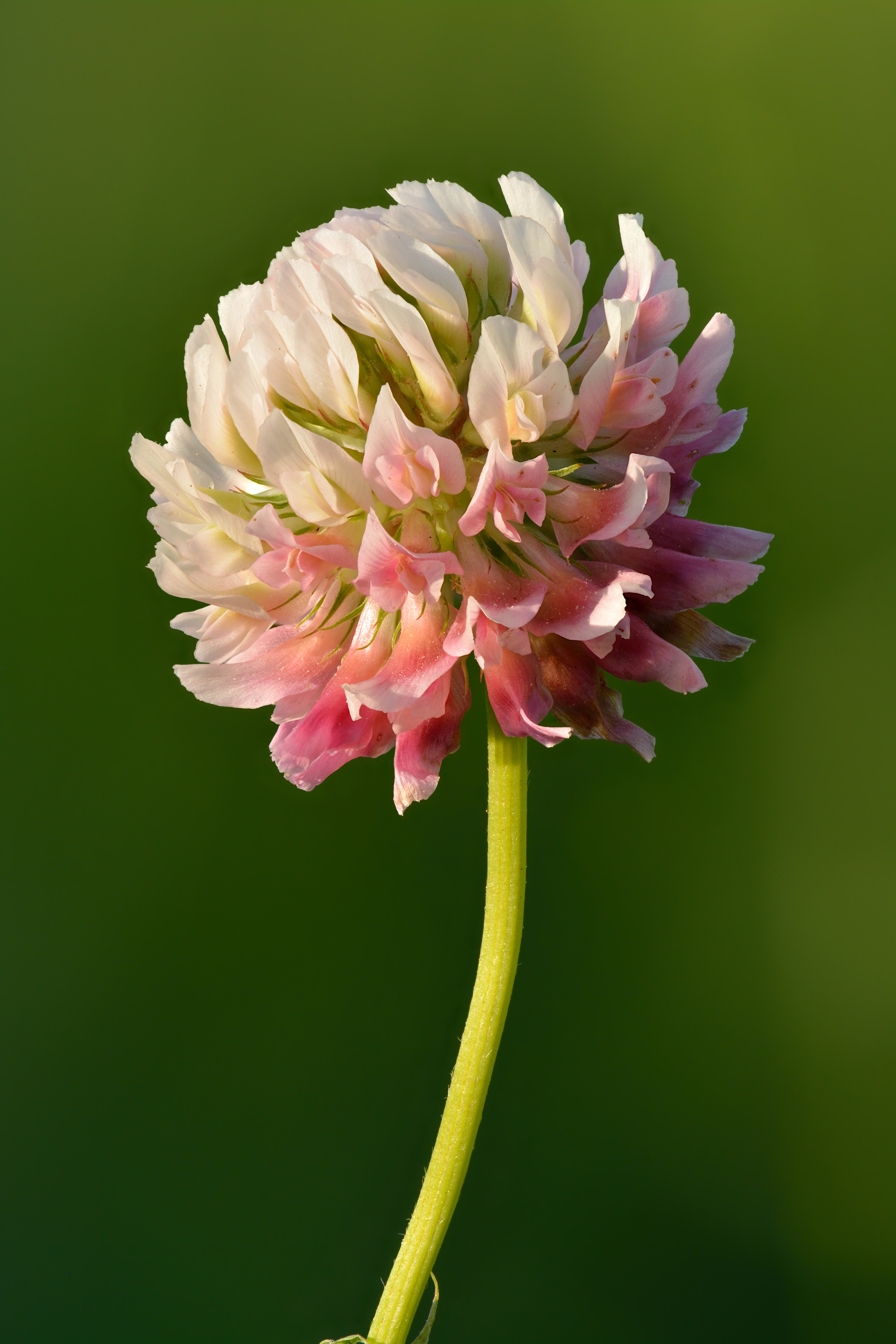

Scientific classification
- Kingdom: Plantae
- Clade: Tracheophytes
- Clade: Angiosperms
- Clade: Eudicots
- Clade: Rosids
- Order: Fabales
- Family: Fabaceae
- Subfamily: Faboideae
- Genus: Trifolium
- Species: T. hybridum

Binomial name
- Trifolium hybridum L.

Subspecies
- Trifolium hybridum subsp. anatolicum (Boiss.) M.Hossain; Trifolium hybridum subsp. elegans (Savi) Asch. & Graebn.; Trifolium hybridum subsp. hybridum

Synonyms
- List: Amoria hybrida (L.) C.Presl (1831); Trifolium elegans subsp. hybridum (L.) Bonnier & Layens (1894)

= Trifolium hybridum =

Alsike clover

Plant species in the pea family

Trifolium hybridum, the alsike clover, is a species of flowering plant in the pea family, Fabaceae. The trifoliate leaves are unmarked and the stalked, pale pink or whitish flower head grows from the leaf axils.

Native to Europe, the plant is found in fields and on roadsides. It has been linked with toxicity in horses. It has some agricultural applications due to its ability to lower soil pH.

== Description ==
Growing up to 40 centimetres (1 1/2 ft) tall, T. hybridum is a perennial plant with a semi-erect, sparsely branched, grooved stem, hairy in its upper regions. The leaves are alternate and stalked with small stipules. The leaves have three blunt-tipped ovate, unspotted leaflets with finely toothed margins.

From April to October in the Northern Hemisphere, the densely globose inflorescence blooms from a long stalk attached to the leaf axils. The individual florets have a five-lobed calyx and an irregular corolla consisting of five pink petals, one upstanding "standard", two lateral "wings" and the lower two fused to form a "keel". There are ten stamens and a single carpal.

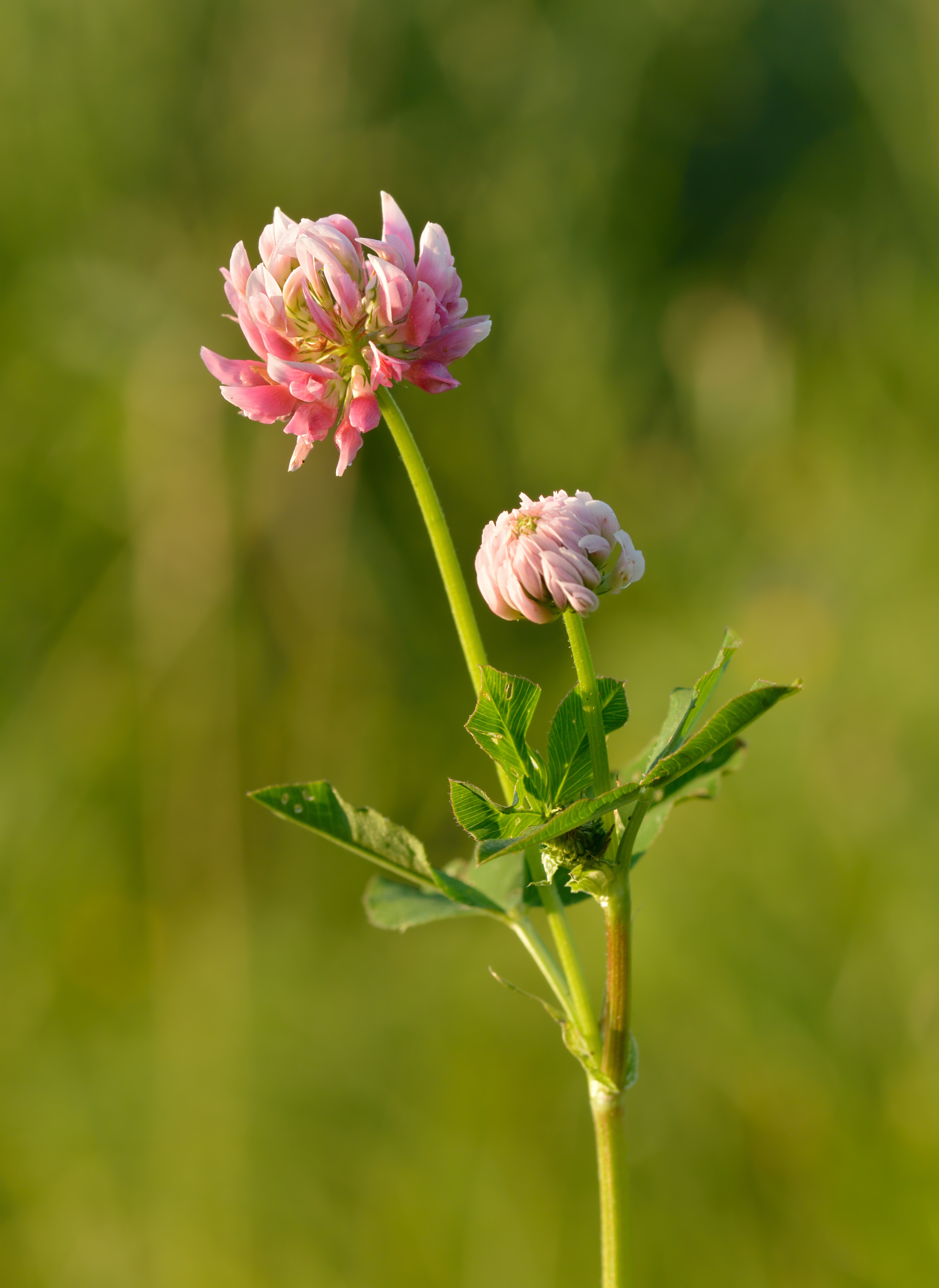
Inflorescence

== Taxonomy ==
Despite its scientific name, alsike clover is not of hybrid origin. The plant gets its common name from the town of Alsike in Sweden from which Carl Linnaeus first described it. He thought it was a cross between T. repens (white clover) and T. pratense (red clover), but in this he was mistaken and it is a separate species.

== Distribution and habitat ==
Originating in mainland Europe, it has become established as an introduced plant in the British Isles and throughout the temperate regions of the world. It is native to southern Europe and southwestern Asia, especially in mountainous regions.

Because of its wide cultivation and use as forage, its subspecies T. h. hybridum is used and has become naturalised further north in Europe and in other parts of the world. Its natural habitat is fields, meadows, roadsides, banks and waste ground. When added to seed mixtures, it seldom persists once the sward has closed up.

== Toxicity ==
There is limited evidence of T. hybridum having toxic effects on horses including photosensitization and Alsike clover poisoning. Photosensitivity in horses, also known as alsike rash, is a reversible condition in which the mechanism is unknown. A diet in equestrians of at least 20% T. hybridum over the course of four weeks could lead to poisoning which includes deleterious neurological effects and liver failure. The active toxin is unknown.

The plant can irritate skin if handled.

== Uses ==
The species has been found to quickly lower soil pH, increasing its viable area of reproduction, whilst reducing the bio-density of weeds by up to 57%. Under the right conditions it may become invasive unless properly managed. With regard to inbreeding, it was found that there were disadvantageous changes to height, persistence, and vigor unless selectively bred for said traits.

It is also grown as fodder (hay or silage).
