= Uppland Runic Inscription 933 =

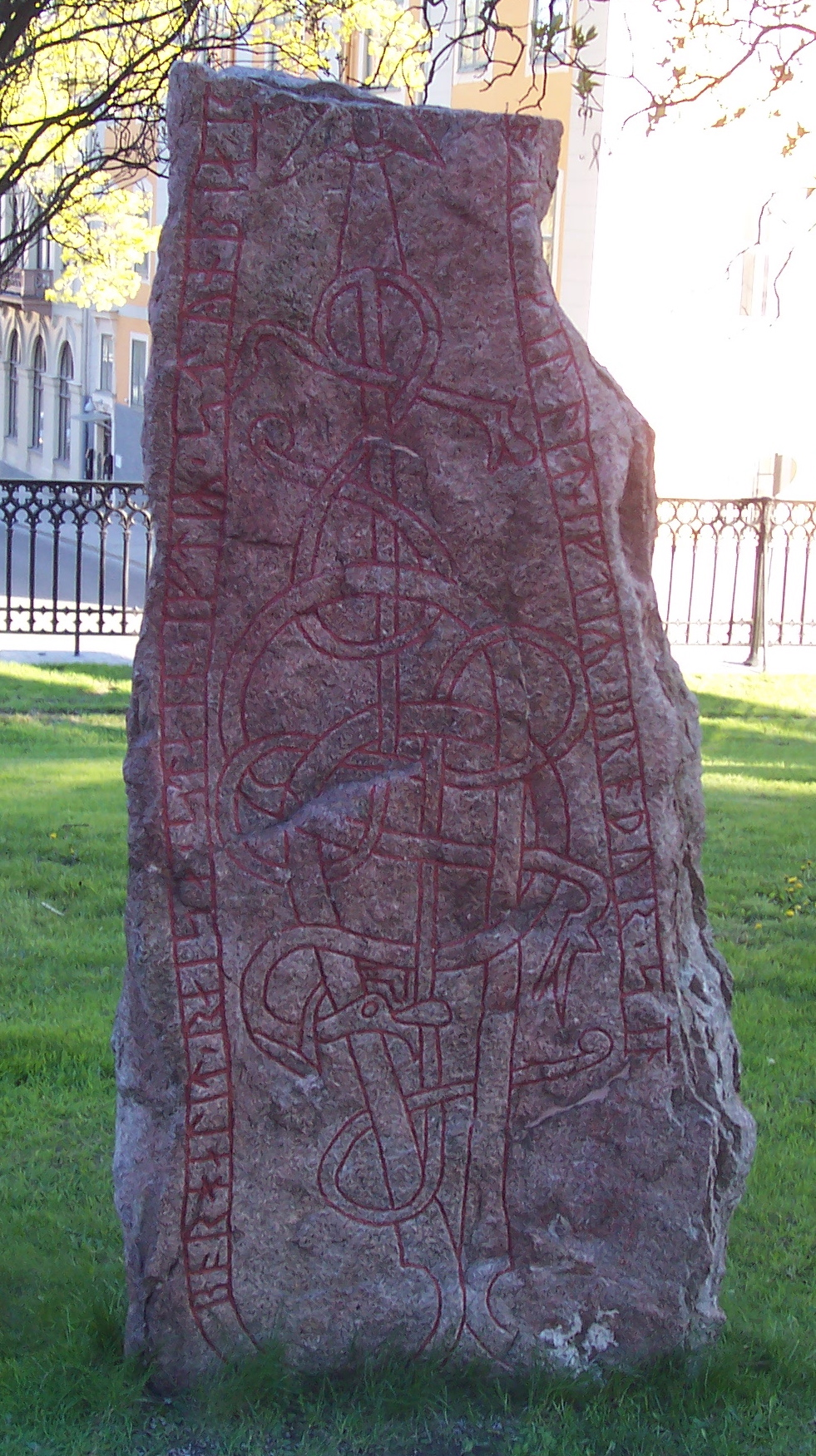
- Created: 11th Century
- Discovered: Uppsala Cathedral, Uppsala, Uppland, Sweden
- Rundata ID: U 933
- Runemaster: Öpir (A)

Text – Native
- Old Norse: Borga let ræisa stæin æftiʀ Stynbior[n] ... [Þ]orkell let æftiʀ broður sinn.

Translation
- Borga had the stone raised in memory of Stynbjǫrn ... Þorkell had (it raised) in memory of his brother.

Uppland Runic Inscription 933 or U 933 is the Rundata catalog number for a granite Viking Age memorial runestone located at the Uppsala Cathedral, which is in the center of Uppsala, Sweden.

== Description ==
This runestone, which is 1.95 meters in height, consists of runic text in the younger futhark carved on an intertwined serpent. It was discovered in 1866 located within the foundation walls of the Uppsala Cathedral. Many runestones were used in the construction of buildings, roads, and bridges before their historical importance was understood. The inscription consists of runic text within a serpent band that circles other intertwined serpents. The inscription is attributed to the runemaster Öpir and is classified as being carved in runestone style Pr5, which is also known as Urnes style. This runestone style is characterized by slim and stylized animals that are interwoven into tight patterns. The animal heads are typically seen in profile with slender almond-shaped eyes and upwardly curled appendages on the noses and the necks.

== Transliteration of runic text into Latin letters ==
borha lit ' raisa ' stain ' iftiʀ ' stynbiar... ... ...orkil lit ' iftiʀ ' broþur ' sin

== See also ==
- List of runestones
