= Alsike, Sweden =

Alsike
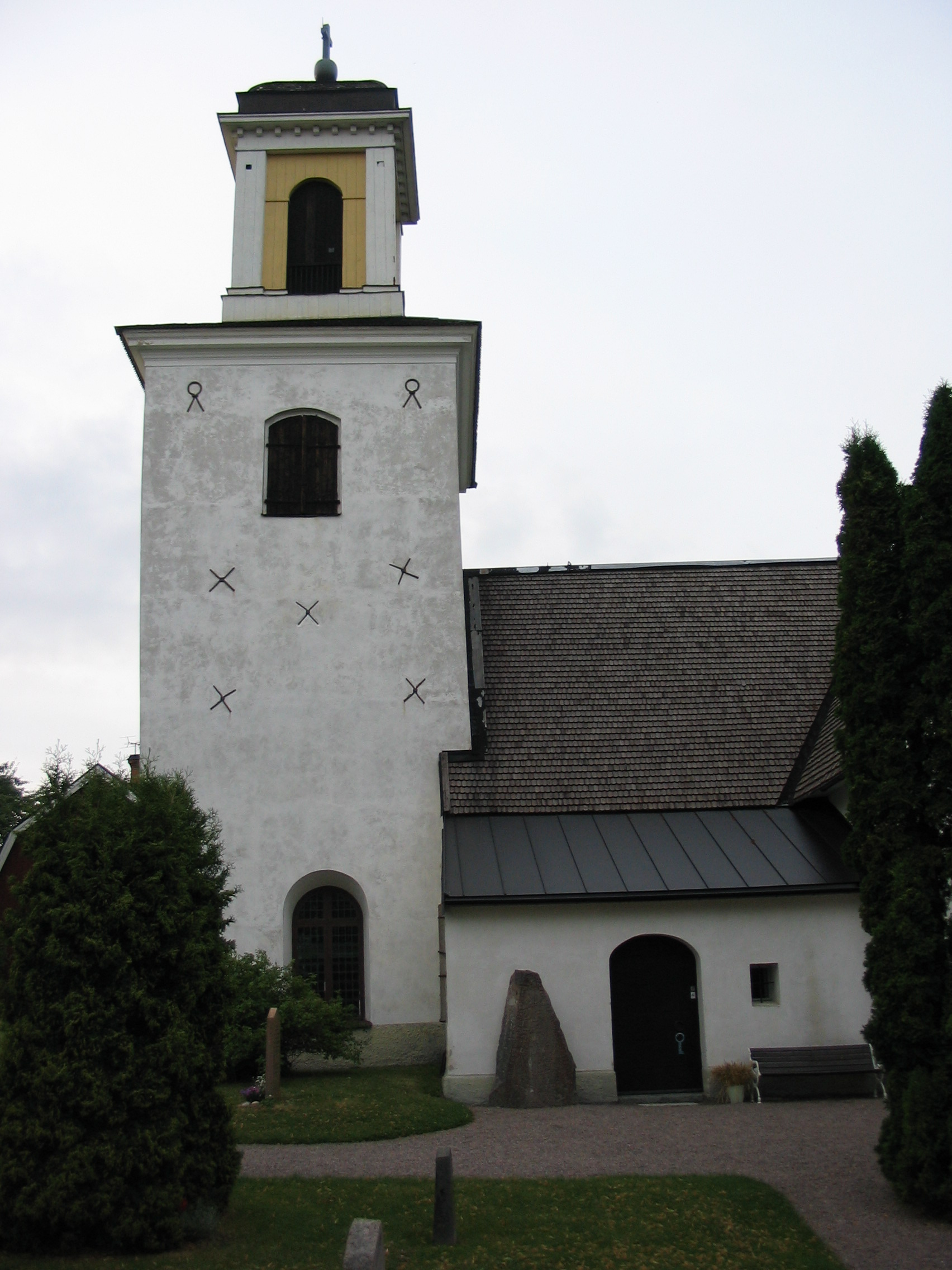
- Alsike Church

- Location within Uppsala Location within Sweden
- Coordinates: 59°48′N 17°46′E
- Country: Sweden
- Province: Uppland
- County: Uppsala County
- Municipality: Knivsta Municipality

Area
  - Total: 2.38 km^{2} (0.92 sq mi)

Population (31 December 2020)
  - Total: 5,057
  - Density: 2,120/km^{2} (5,500/sq mi)
- Time zone: UTC+1 (CET)
  - Summer (DST): UTC+2 (CEST)

Alsike (Swedish pronunciation: [ˈɑ̂ːlˌsiːkɛ]) is a locality situated in Knivsta Municipality, Uppsala County, Sweden with 2,681 inhabitants in 2010. Alsike is located about 50 km north of Stockholm and only 25 km away from Arlanda Airport. It is also the location of Sisters of the Holy Spirit at Alsike Abbey. Alsike is located on the Ingegerdsleden, a historic pilgrimage route between Uppsala Cathedral and Storkyrkan in Stockholm. Alsike clover gets its common name from Alsike, Sweden.

== See also ==
- Alsike Church
- Uppland Runic Inscription Fv1948;168
