= Uppland Runic Inscription 489 =

Swedish Viking memorial

Coordinates: 59.8577°N 17.6314°E

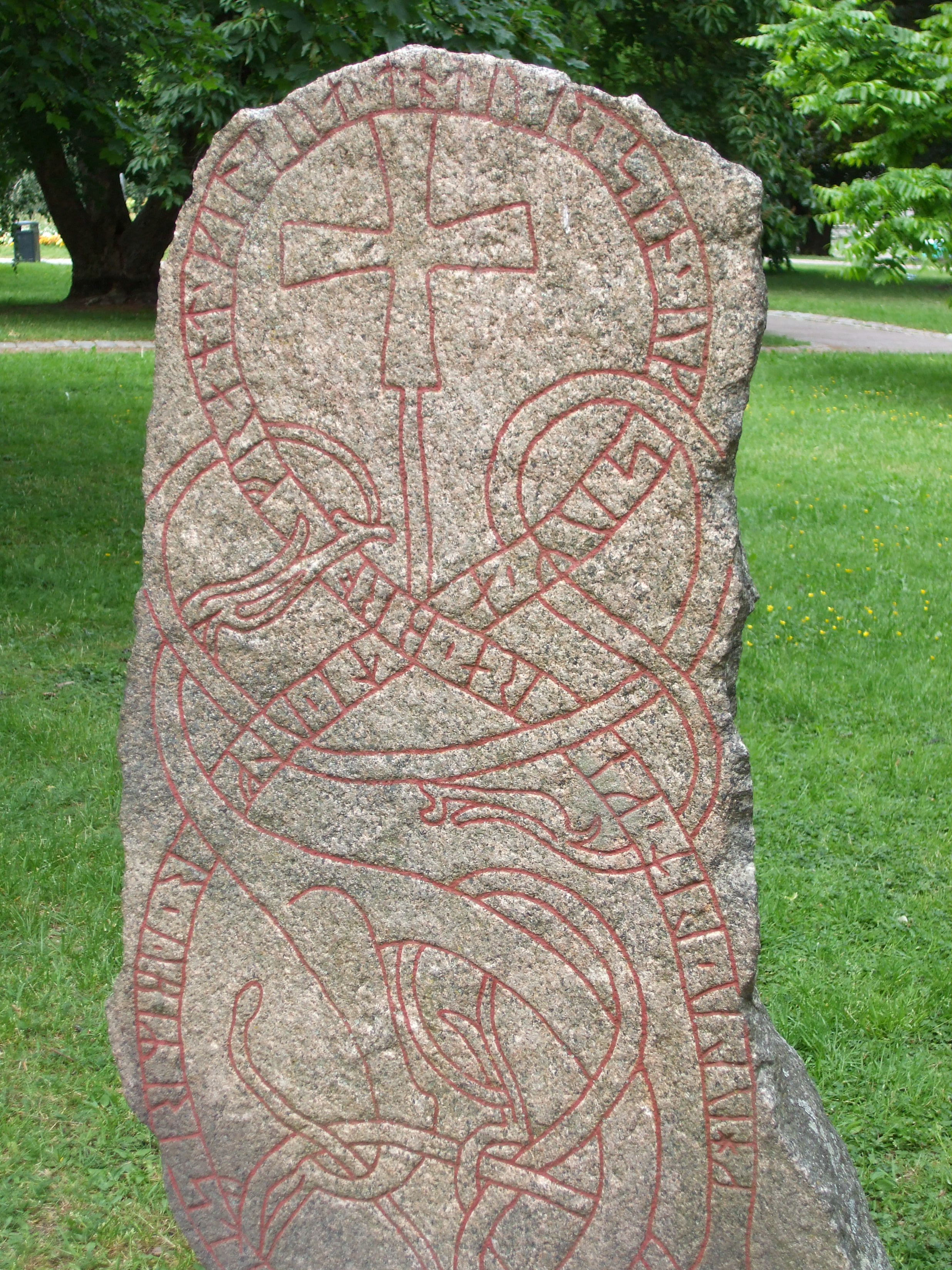
- Created: eleventh century
- Discovered: Uppsala University, Uppsala, Uppland, Sweden
- Rundata ID: U 489
- Runemaster: Öpir

This Viking Age runestone, listed under Rundata as runic inscription U 489, was originally located in Morby, Uppland, Sweden, and is a memorial to a woman.

== Description ==
This runestone was shipped together with two other runestones, runic inscriptions U 896 and U 1011, to the Exposition Universelle in Paris in 1867. Today it is located at Uppsala University at the Universitetsparken (University Park).

The reference to bridge-building in the runic text is fairly common in rune stones during this time period. Some are Christian references related to passing the bridge into the afterlife. At this time, the Catholic Church sponsored the building of roads and bridges through the use of indulgences in return for intercession for the soul. There are over one hundred examples of bridge runestones that have been dated from the eleventh century, including inscriptions Sö 101 in Ramsund, Sö 328 in Tynäs, U 617 in Bro, U 861 in Norsta, and U 993 in Brunnby. On this runestone, the Christian message is reinforced by the image of the cross within the serpent text band.

It is unusual for a memorial runestone to be dedicated to a woman, and even more unusual for a memorial to a woman be sponsored by a woman. A survey indicated that less than 1 per cent of all runestones fall into this later category. The husband of Gillaug is not mentioned in the inscription as a sponsor of the stone. This could be because Ulfr was dead at the time of the carving of this memorial for his wife.

This runestone is signed by the runemaster Öpir, who was active in the late 11th and early 12th centuries. It is classified as being carved in runestone style Pr4, also known as late Urnes style. This runestone style is characterized by slim and stylized animals that are interwoven into tight patterns. The animal heads are typically seen in profile with slender almond-shaped eyes and upwardly curled appendages on the noses and the necks.

== Inscription ==
khulu ' lit ' kira ' bro fr ant ' kilaua ' totur ' sin ' uk sum ' ati ' ulfr ' ybiʀ risti
Gullaug(?) {} let {} gæra {} bro fyr and {} Gillaugaʀ, {} dottur {} sinnaʀ {} ok sum {} atti {} Ulfʀ. {} Øpiʀ risti.
Gullaug(?) had the bridge made for the spirit of Gillaug, her daughter, and whom Ulfr owned (i.e. was married to). Öpir carved.

== See also ==
- List of runestones
