= Uppland Runic Inscription Fv1976 107 =

Coordinates: 59°51′29″N 17°38′06″E

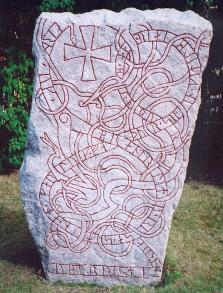
- Created: eleventh century
- Discovered: Uppsala Cathedral, Uppsala, Uppland, Sweden
- Rundata ID: U Fv1976;107
- Runemaster: Öpir

This runic inscription, designated as U Fv1976;107 under the Rundata catalog, is located at the Uppsala Cathedral in Uppsala, Sweden.

== Description ==
The runic inscription consists of text inscribed on a thin intertwined beast with one upper loop around a Christian cross and two lower loops. This runestone was discovered in 1975 being used as building material at the southern buttress of the Vasa burial chapel during renovations at the Uppsala Cathedral. Many runestones have been reused in building, road, and bridge construction before their historical importance was recognized. The runic inscription was carved by the runemaster Öpir, whose signature is at the bottom of the inscription in a horizontal text band. Öpir was active in the Uppland region during the late eleventh or early twelfth centuries. The inscription is classified as being in runestone style Pr4, which is also known as the Urnes style. This runestone style is characterized by slim and stylized animals that are interwoven into tight patterns. The animal heads are typically seen in profile with slender almond-shaped eyes and upwardly curled appendages on the noses and the necks.

The runic text is missing a pronoun, the word "his" before "brother." Öpir is known to have left off possessive pronouns in some of his other inscricriptions, such as that on U 993 in Brunnby. Additionally, he left off the final "ʀ" in rúnaʀ, or "runes," which he also did on inscriptions such as that on U 181 in Össeby-Garn.

Of the personal names listed in the runic inscription, Ketilbjôrn means "Kettle Bear" and Karlungr, originally used as a nickname, means "Young Man."

The Rundata designation for this Uppland inscription, U Fv1976;107, refers to the year and page number of the issue of Fornvännen in which the runestone was first described.

== Inscription ==
…-arn · uk · brantr litu · risa · stin · at · karluk · faþur · sin in · kitilbiarn at · broþur ybir risti run
…[bj]ǫrn(?) {} ok {} Brandr létu {} reisa {} stein {} at {} Kǫrlung, {} fǫður {} sinn, en {} Ketilbjǫrn at {} bróður. Œpir risti rúnar.
…-bjǫrn and Brandr had the stone raised in memory of Karlungr, their father; and Ketilbjǫrn in memory of (his) brother. Œpir carved the runes.

== See also ==
- List of runestones
- Runic alphabet
