= Gällsta Runestones =

11th century commemoration, Sweden

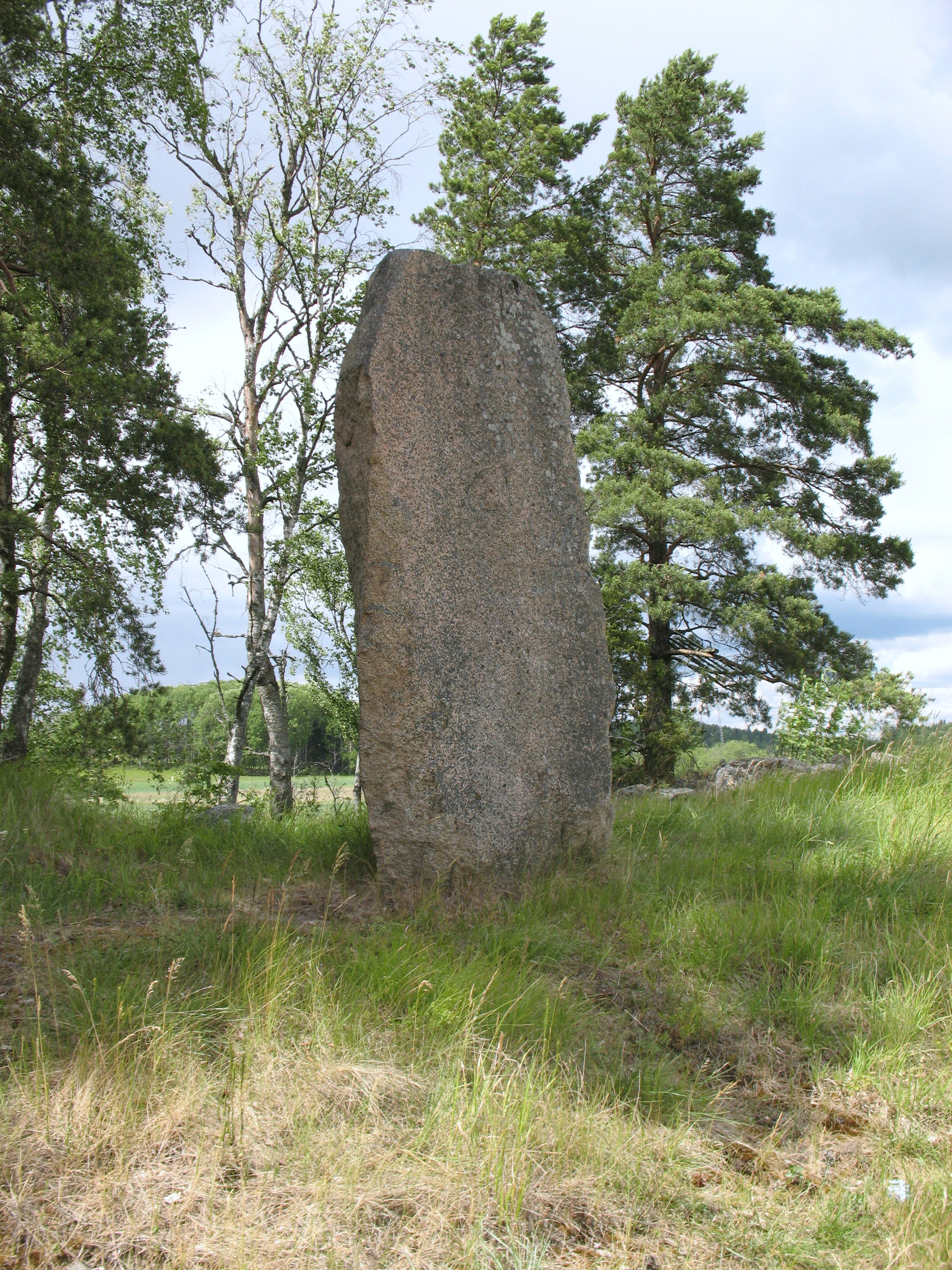
A raised uninscribed stone at Gällsta.

The Gällsta Runestones from the 11th century commemorate four generations of the same family in Viking Age Sweden. There are three runestones (U 229, U 231 and U 232) and a raised stone which is only inscribed with a cross (U 230). The runestones are located at the northern outskirts of Stockholm, just northwest of the lake Vallentunasjön, around which is found the world's greatest concentration of runestones. All the Gällsta Runestones are attributed to Öpir, the most productive of all the old runemasters.

The oldest two generations, Þorbjörn and his son Oddi, are only mentioned on U 229. The runestone informs that Oddi had two sons Halfdan and Tobbi or Tubbi. U 231 was raised in memory of Halfdan by his four children Heðinvé, Eysteinn, Ulfr and Ólafr, while U 232 was raised in memory of Tobbi/Tubbi by his three sons Tosti, Sigfuss and Sigmarr.

Below follows a presentation of the Gällsta Runestones based on information collected from the Rundata project. The transcriptions from runic inscriptions into standardized Old Norse are in the Swedish and Danish dialect to facilitate comparison with the inscriptions, while the English translation provided by Rundata give the names in standard dialect (the Icelandic and Norwegian dialect).

== U 229 ==
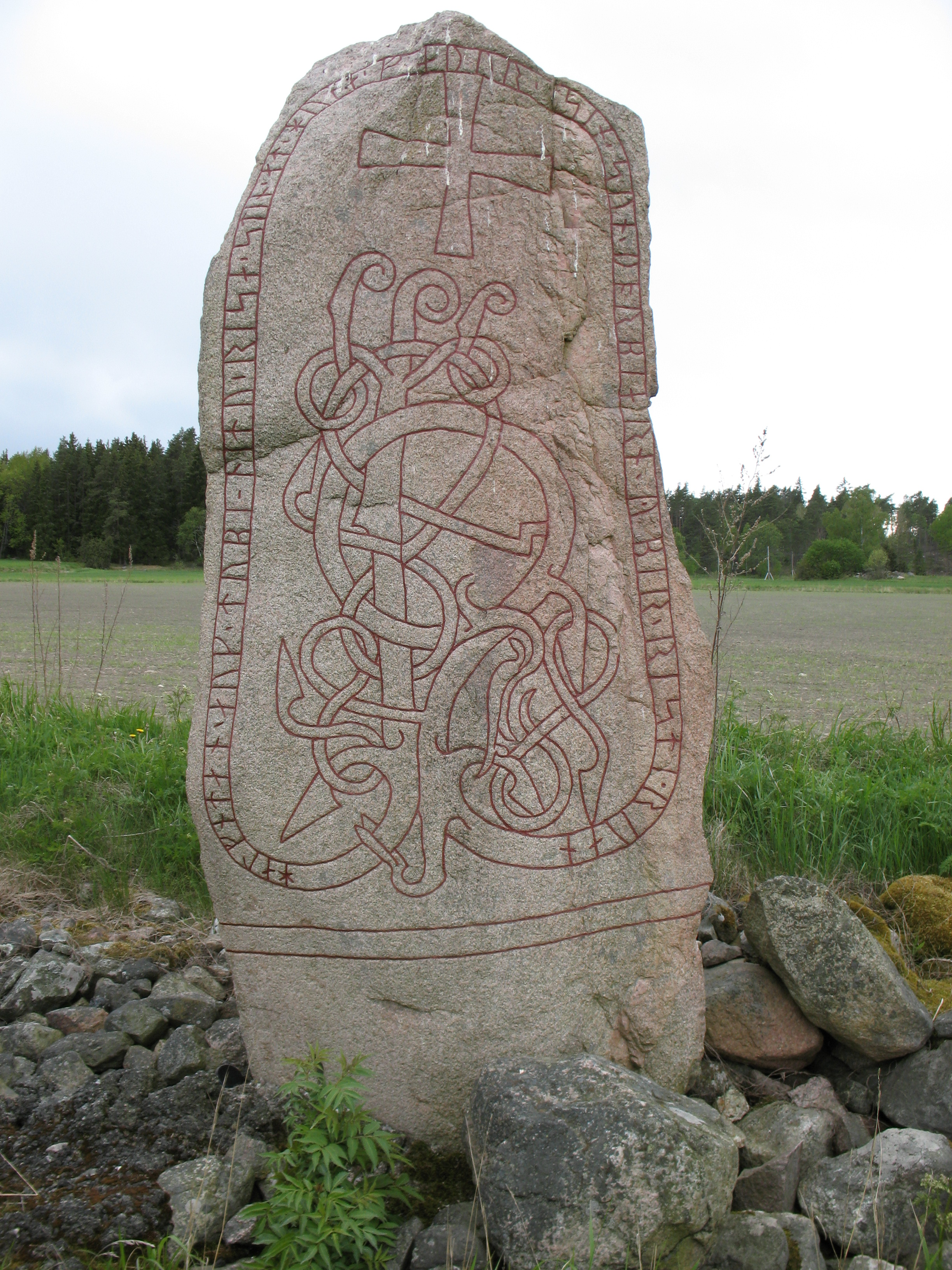
The runestone U 229.

This granite runestone in style Pr4 (Urnes style) was made by the notable runemaster Öpir who made more than 60 runestones.

halfntan ÷ auk ' tubi ÷ litu ' risa ' stin ' at ' huta ' faþur ' sin ' sun * þorbiarn ÷ ybir ÷ risti * ruan
Halfdan {} ok {} Tobbi/Tubbi {} letu {} ræisa {} stæin {} at {} Udda, {} faður {} sinn, {} sun {} Þorbiarnaʀ. {} Øpiʀ {} risti {} runaʀ.
"Halfdan and Tobbi/Tubbi had the stone raised in memory of Oddi, their father, Þorbjôrn's son. Œpir carved the runes."

== U 231 ==
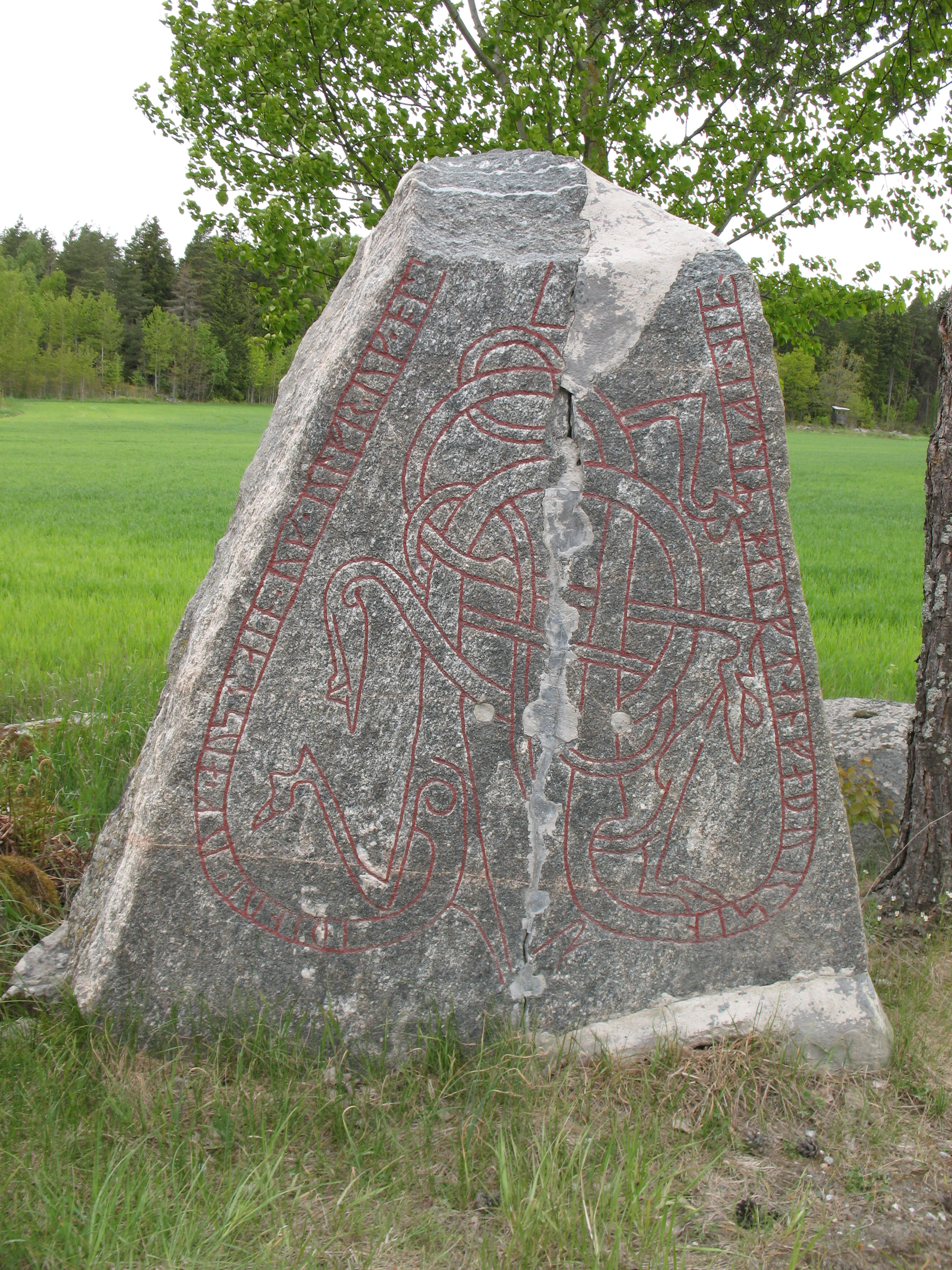
The runestone U 231.

This runestone of gneiss-granite is in style Pr5 (Urnes style) and the runemaster has been identified as Öpir. The stone is dated to the period c. 1080 – c. 1130 AD. It was discovered in 1633 and it was depicted by the runologists of the time. Afterwards, it was lost for a long time, until it was rediscovered in the 1870s on the nearby farm Söderlund which belonged to the magistrate of the hundred. The magistrate had divided the stone into two pieces to use them as gate posts, and when the antiquarian Richard Dybeck learned of this, he went to see the magistrate and severely admonished him. The latter was surprised with the allegations as not even the surveyor was able to read the "figures". The stone has been reassembled but it still misses the upper part.

iþinui ' uk ' austain ' uk ' ulfr ' uk * ol(a)[fr * litu * raisa * s]tain * iftiʀ hal(f)tan faþur sin
Heðinvi {} ok {} Øystæinn {} ok {} Ulfʀ {} ok {} Olafʀ {} letu {} ræisa {} stæin {} æftiʀ Halfdan, faður sinn.
"Heðinvé and Eysteinn and Ulfr and Ólafr had the stone raised in memory of Halfdan, their father."

== U 232 ==
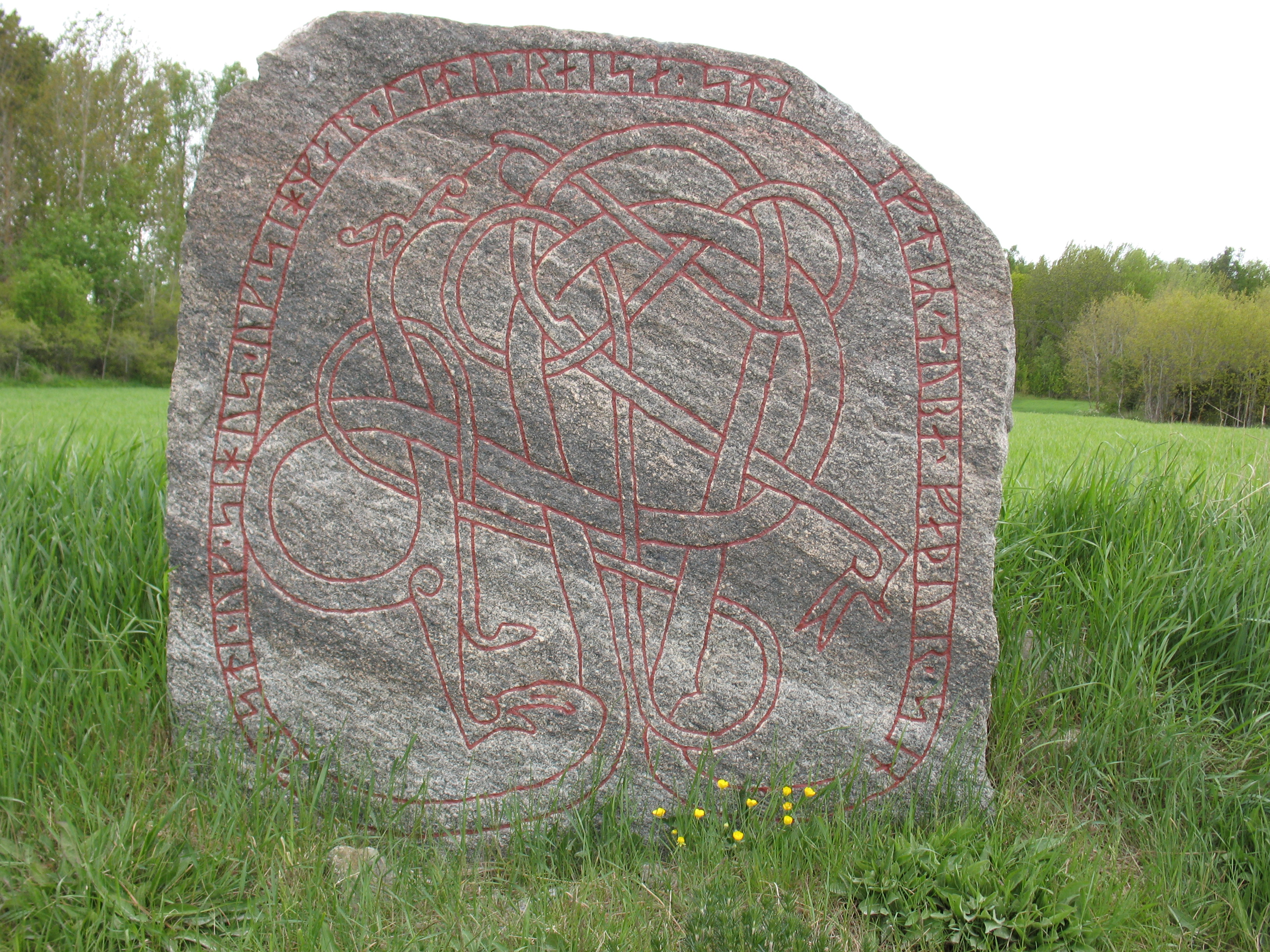
The runestone U 232.

This runestone of granite is in style Pr5 and like the previous runestones, the runemaster is identified as Öpir.

tosti ÷ uk ' sihus ' uk ' sihmar ' litu ' raisa ' sta-- * iftiʀ ÷ tuba ÷ faþur * sin
Tosti {} ok {} Sigfuss {} ok {} Sigmarr {} letu {} ræisa {} stæ[in] {} æftiʀ {} Tobba/Tubba, {} faður {} sinn.
"Tosti and Sigfúss and Sigmarr had the stone raised in memory of Tobbi/Tubbi, their father."

== See also ==
- List of runestones

== Sources ==
- Rundata
- Gällsta - website of the Stockholm County Museum.
