= Uppland Runic Inscription 993 =

Viking runestone in Brunnby, Sweden

Coordinates: 59.8579°N 17.8141°E

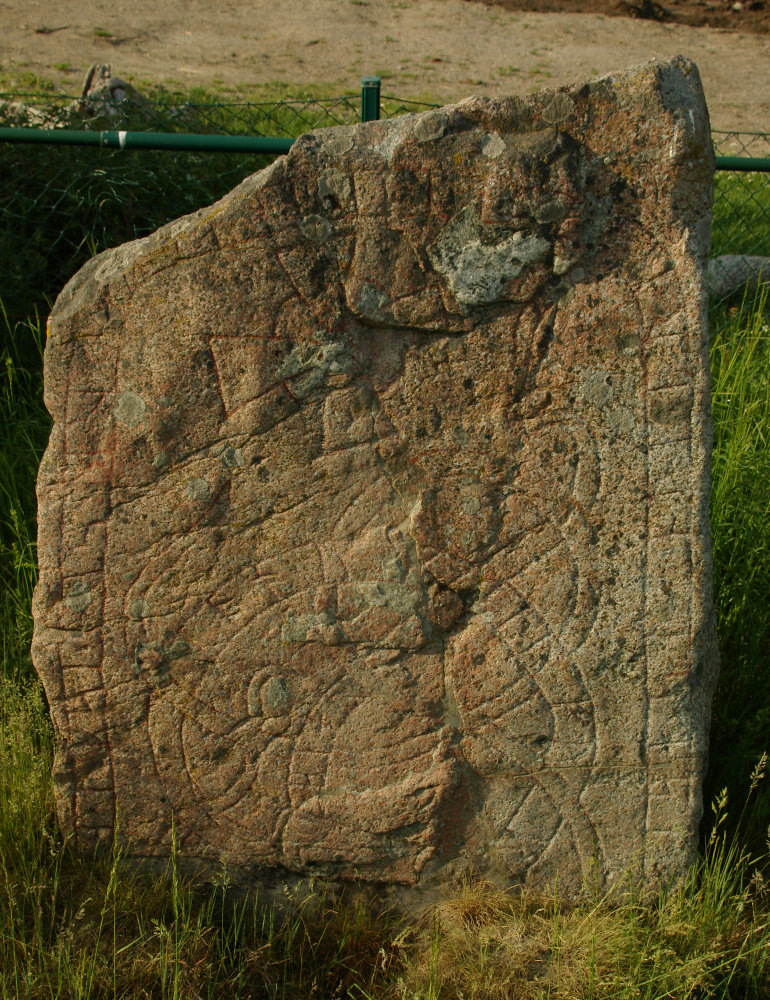
U 993 in Brunnby.

Uppland Runic Inscription 993 or U 993 is the Rundata catalog number for a Viking Age memorial runestone located in Brunnby, which is one kilometer west of Gunsta, Uppsala County, Sweden, which was part of the historical province of Uppland.

== Description ==
This inscription consists of runic text on a serpent that circles and then becomes intertwined in the center of the design under a Christian cross. The stone, which is 1.5 meters in height, is classified as being carved in runestone style Pr4, which is also known as Urnes style. This runestone style is characterized by slim and stylized animals that are interwoven into tight patterns. The animal heads are typically seen in profile with slender almond-shaped eyes and upwardly curled appendages on the noses and the necks. The runic inscription was carved and signed by runemasters named Öpir and Bjorn. Öpir was active in the Uppland region during the late eleventh or early twelfth centuries and signed almost fifty inscriptions, with another fifty attributed to him based on stylistic analysis. Runic inscriptions are often dated based upon comparative linguistic and stylistic analysis, and the inscription on U 181 has been dated as being carved approximately during the period of 1070 to 1100 C.E.

The runic text states that the stone was raised by two sons, Jón and Jǫfurfast, as a memorial to their father Vígi, who was the son of a man named Eysteinn. The runic text is missing a possessive pronoun, the word "their" before "father." Öpir is known to have left off pronouns in some of his other inscriptions, such as U Fv1976;107 at the Uppsala Cathedral, U 961 in Vaksala, and U 984 in Ekeby.

== Inscription ==
=== Transliteration of the runes into Latin characters ===
ion * u(k) iufur[-ast litu r]aisa ' stin uk ' bru ' iftiʀ ' uiha ' faþur ' su[n] ' istin[s ybiʀ * rist-] biarn

=== Transcription into Old Norse ===
Ion ok Iofur[f]ast letu ræisa stæin ok bro æftiʀ Viga, faður, sun Øystæins/Æistæins. Øpiʀ rist[i]. Biorn.

=== Translation in English ===
Jón and Jǫfurfast had the stone raised and the bridge (made) in memory of Vígi, (their) father, Eysteinn's son. Œpir carved. Bjǫrn.

== See also ==
- List of runestones
