= Västergötland Runic Inscription 8 =

Viking Age memorial runestone

Coordinates: 58.6075°N 14.0114°E

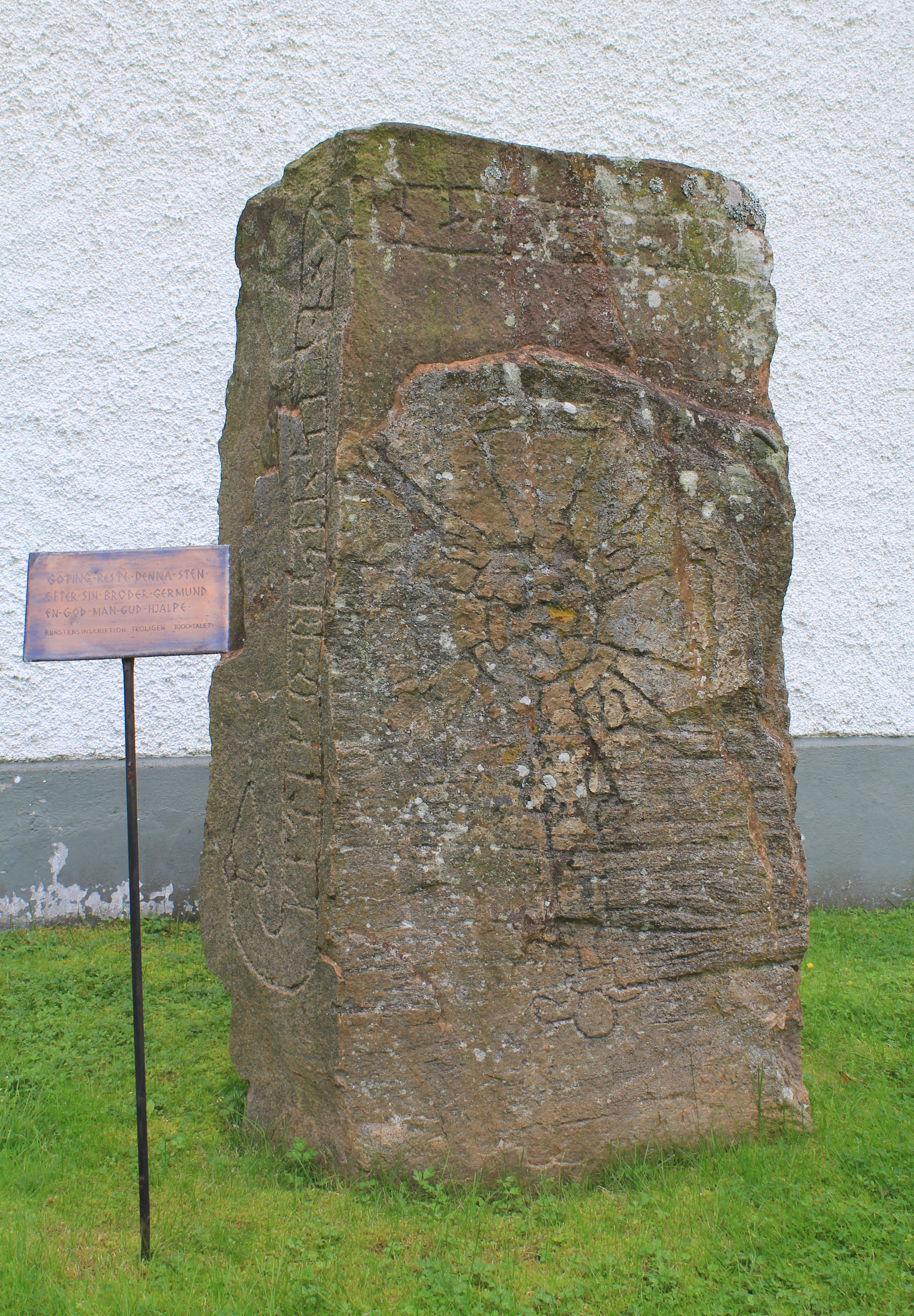
Vg 8 near the church at Hjälstad.

Västergötland Runic Inscription 8 or Vg 8 is the Rundata listing for a Viking Age memorial runestone located at the church at Hjälstad, which is about one kilometer west of Moholm, Västra Götaland County, Sweden, and in the historic province of Västergötland.

== Description ==
The inscription on Vg 8 consists of runes carved in the younger futhark on a serpent that runs up one edge of the runestone, across its face, and then down the other edge. On the face of the stone is a large cross, and a second cross is located above the end of the serpent's tail. The inscription is classified as being carved in runestone style Fp. This is the classification for inscriptions with runic bands that have attached serpent or beast heads depicted as seen from above. The stone was discovered in the north wall of the church in 1890. Before the historic nature of runestones was understood, they were often reused as materials in the construction of buildings, churches, and bridges. The stone was removed from the church wall in 1937 and raised in the churchyard.

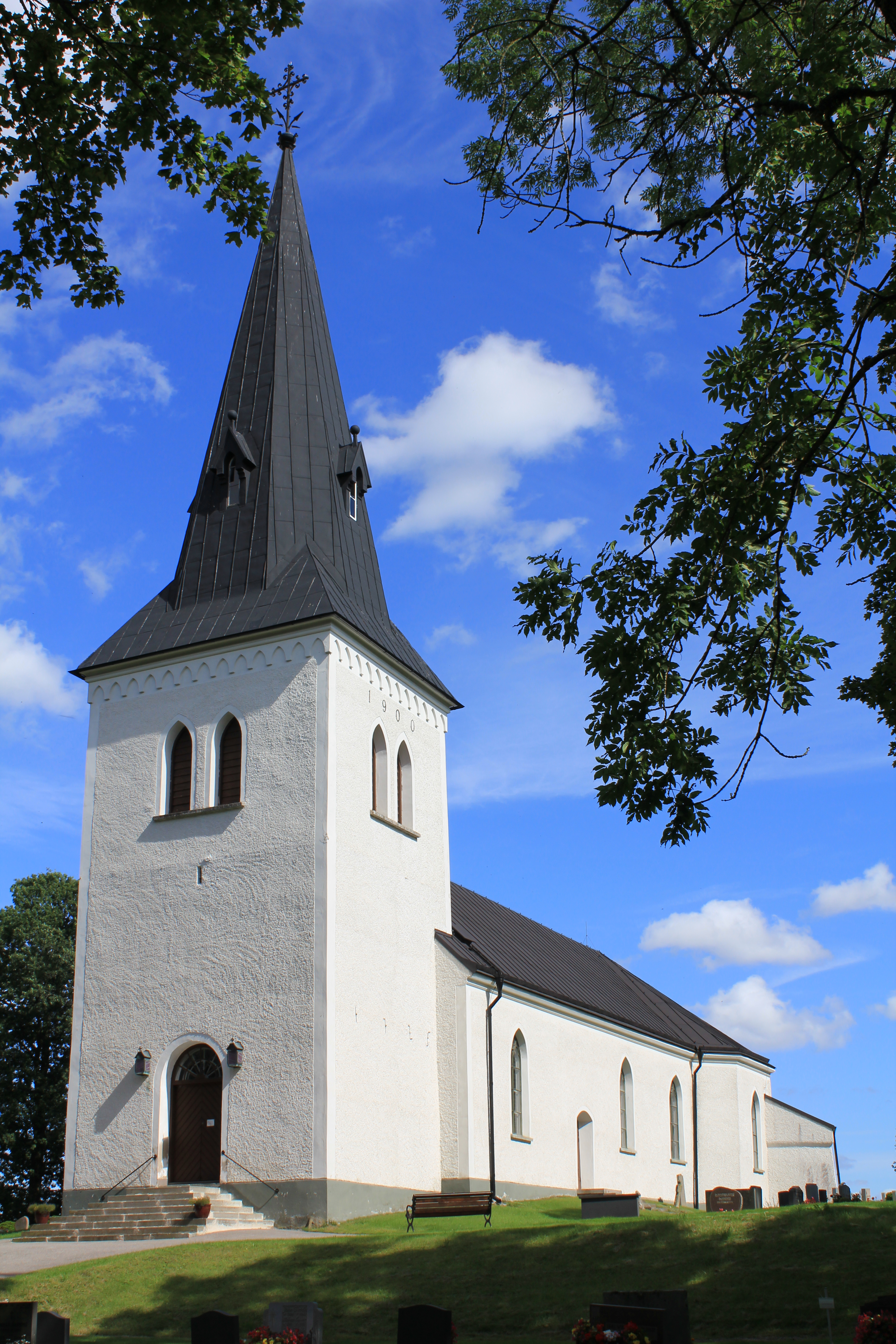
The church at Hjälstad.

The runic text states that the stone was raised by a man possibly named Geitingr in memory of his brother Geirmundr. Geirmundr is described as being þegn goðan or "a good thegn," a phrase that is also used on runestone DR 143 from Gunderup and, in its plural form, on Sö 34 from Tjuvstigen. A thegn was a class of retainer, and about fifty memorial runestones in Denmark and Sweden mention that the deceased was a thegn. The runic text ends with a short prayer, which is on the serpent's tail below the smaller cross.

== Inscription ==
=== Transliteration of the runes into Latin characters ===
kitikr × risti × stin × þena × eftiʀ × kimut × bruþur × sin × þen × kuþaa × kuþ albi ×

=== Transcription into Old Norse ===
Gæitingʀ(?) ræisti stæin þenna æftiʀ Gæiʀmund, broður sinn, þegn goðan. Guð hialpi.

=== Translation in English ===
Geitingr(?) raised this stone in memory of Geirmundr, his brother, a good thegn. May God help.
