= Magnus Söderman =

Swedish far-right activist

- Born: Klas Magnus Söderman; 9 May 1977 (age 48); Solna, Sweden

Klas Magnus Söderman (born 9 May 1977) is a Swedish far-right activist, author and Christian Identity pastor. He is also the former spokesman for the terror-classified by the US state department Nordic Resistance Movement.

== Early life ==
Söderman was born on May 9, 1977, at Karolinska Hospital in Solna, Stockholm. He spent his childhood in Kallhäll, Järfälla municipality, north of Stockholm. His engagement with nationalism began in the sixth grade.

== Political career ==
Söderman has been politically active since 1989. During the 1990s, he participated in the Engelbrektsmarschen, an event associated with the Sweden Democrats. He joined the Reichsfront (Riksfronten) and later moved to Fagersta where the group had its headquarters to work with the leadership. After Riksfronten's closure, Söderman contacted the Aryan Nations and became convinced of the Christian identity doctrine. Söderman started several projects whose goal was to spread the teachings of the Aryan Nations to Sweden: Aryan Nations/Sweden, the Christian Church of Jesus Christ, the Christian Nationschurch, the Christian Renaissance Study Society. Disappointed by the lack of interest for christianity within Swedish nationalism, Söderman abandoned the projects.

During the 2000s, Söderman was the spokesperson and chief idealogue for the Nordic Resistance Movement (then the Swedish Resistance Movement) and left the organization in 2010. In March 2012, Söderman announced that he had joined the Party of the Swedes. He belonged to the editorial board of the newspaper Framåt and in 2012 started Radio Framåt together with Dan Eriksson and Jonas De Geer.

== Russo-Ukrainian war ==
Söderman organized the so-called "Svenska Ukraina Frivilliga" (Swedish Ukraine Volunteers) in 2014, a project whose goal was to encourage Swedish Nazis to go to Ukraine and participate in the Maidan uprising. With the help of contacts in the Ukrainian Svoboda Party and the Right Sector, they would ensure that the new government formation would be nationalist. In May 2015, Söderman was among the eight Swedes sanctioned by Russia during the Russo-Ukrainian War. Alongside Söderman were Gunnar Karlson, then head of Swedish Military Intelligence and Security Service, and Prime Minister Carl Bildt.

== Det fria Sverige ==
He co-founded Det fria Sverige (The free Sweden) in 2017 and later Dagens Svegot. Together with several others, Söderman moved to the town of Älgarås to establish "Svenskarnas hus" (Swedes House), a headquarters for The Free Sweden.

On October 8, 2023, Söderman commented on Twitter regarding the October 7 attacks that he takes "the side of the European peoples" in the conflict.

On October 26, 2021, Det fria Sweden, DFS, held a digital member meeting where the issue of regrowth was on the agenda, when chairman Dan Eriksson and Söderman were on hand to inform the members about the plans to start a youth department.

When the Sweden Democrat and Riks-profile Rebecka Fallenkvist shouted "Helg Seger" with outstretched arm at the Sweden Democrats' election night watch party in 2022, Det Fria Sverige started selling t-shirts with the phrase. Söderman commented that "It makes me happy that it has spread all the way into these corridors".

Söderman authored the novel The Defiant One, the plot of which revolves around a young white woman whose Swedish high school is composed mainly of blacks and Muslims.

== Authored books ==
- 2009 - Rise against ragnarök, National resistance
- 2011 - In defense of the north: a nationalist battle script, Logik
- 2011 - Another Germany, Logik
- 2013 - The Defiant One: a short story about now and soon, Logik
- 2016 - I Was There: Memories of 20 Years of Street Fighting, Jomada Media UG
- 2016 - Glimpses of life: a collection of short stories, Motgift ltd
- 2016 - Fortress europe, Motgift ltd
- 2017 - Hell victory!: A decade in the Swedish resistance movement, Jomada Media UG
- 2017 - A nationalism for the 21st century, Jomada Media UG
- 2018 - The Odal people and manna unions: then, now and in the future, Logik
- 2021 - The victim, Logik
- 2021 - Swedish youth - Sweden's future, Logik
- 2022 - Pandemitakankar, Logik
- 2023 - Racist, sure?, Logik
- 2025 - Själsånger, Logik
