= Fuglie 1 Runestone =

Viking Age runestone engraved in Old Norse with the Younger Futhark runic alphabet

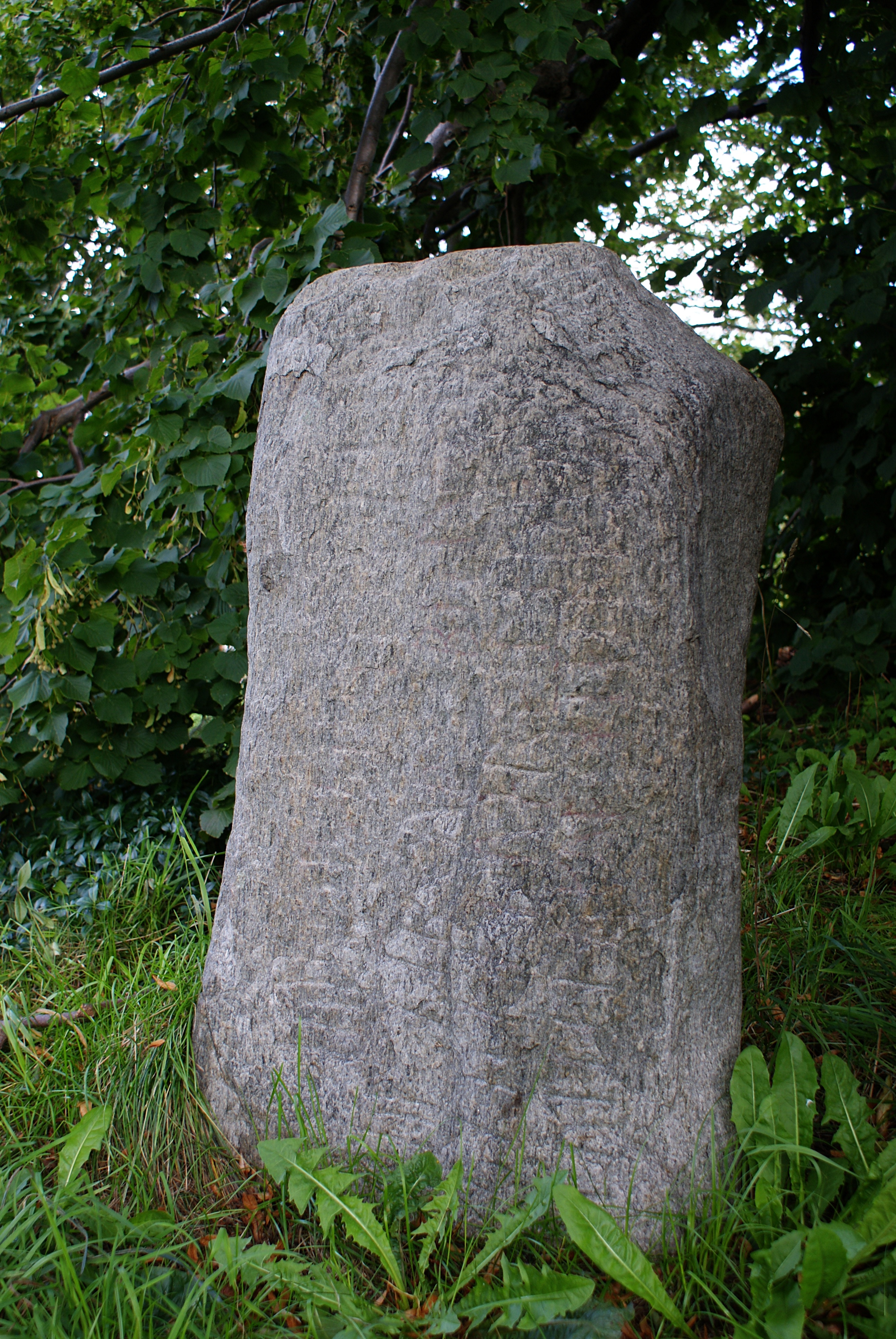
Fuglie 1 Runestone (DR 259)

The Fuglie 1 Runestone (DR 259) is a Viking Age runestone engraved in Old Norse with the Younger Futhark runic alphabet. It was first mentioned by Skonvig and it is still located in its original location on a Nordic Bronze Age mound next to the church of Fuglie, Skåne, Sweden. There are many local legends and traditions about the stone. The stone is 105 cm tall, 63 cm wide, and 33 cm thick. The stone is dated to the period 970–1020, and the style of the runestone was the runestone style RAK.

== Inscription ==
autr ' risþi ' stin ' þonsi ' ¶ ' auftiʀ ' auþ(a) ' bruþur ' ¶ ' sin ' han ' uarþ ' tauþr ' ¶ ' o ' kutlati ' kuþ ' hialbi ' ha(n)s ' silu
Øndr {} resþi {} sten {} þænsi {} {} {} æftiʀ {} Øþa, {} broþur {} {} {} sin, {} han {} warþ {} døþr {} {} {} a {} Gotlandi. {} Guþ {} hialpi {} hans {} sælu.
"Eyndr raised this stone in memory of Auði, his brother. He died in Gotland. May God help his soul. "
