= Gunderup Runestone =

10th century raised stone in Jutland, Denmark

Coordinates: 56.9415°N 10.0151°E

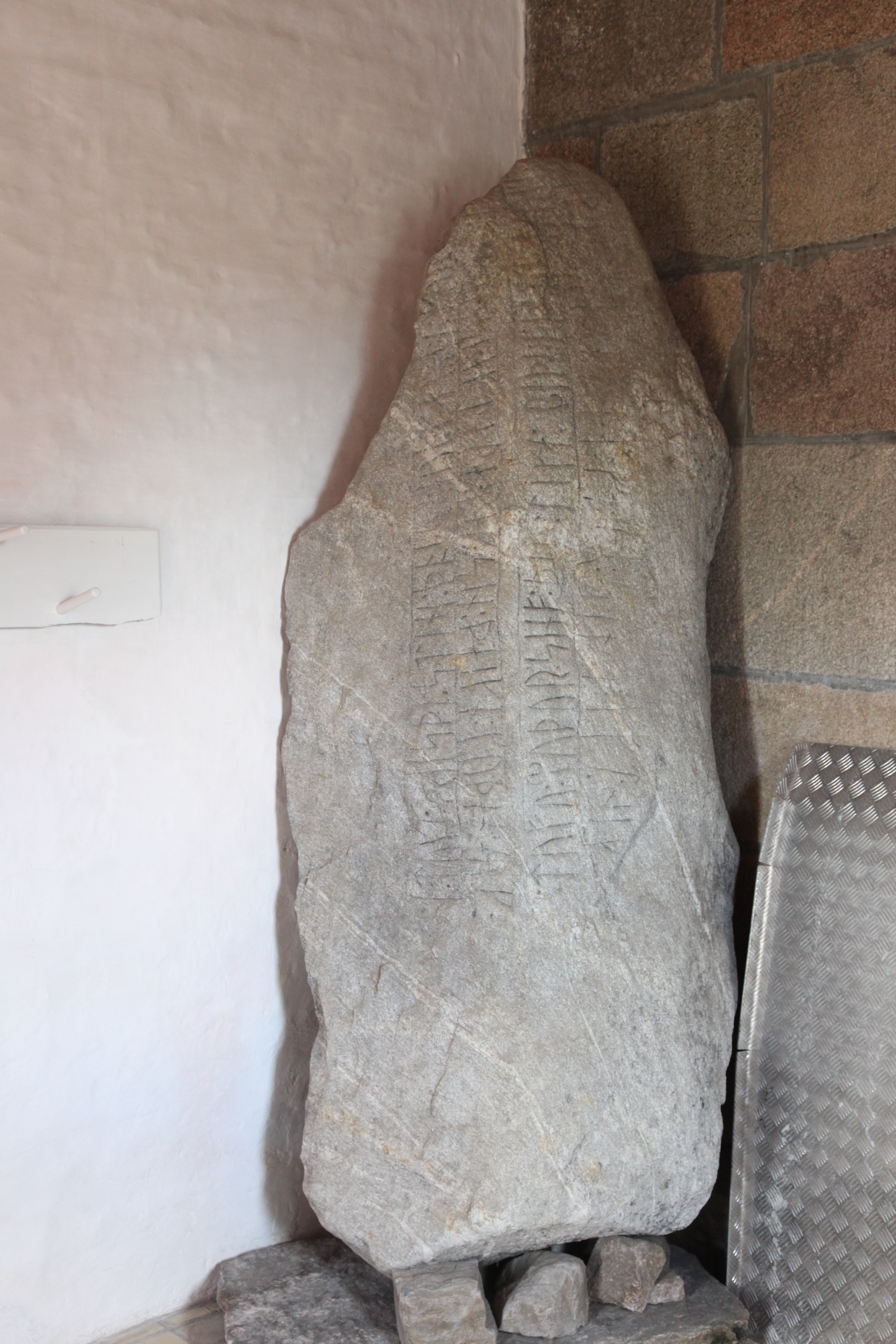
The Gunderup Runestone.

The Gunderup Runestone, or DR 143, is located in Gunderup, North Jutland County, Jutland, Denmark. It is notable because it is one of few runestones raised in commemoration of a woman.

== Description ==
The Gunderup Runestone was first documented in 1629 as being located on a hill, but was later used for construction materials. The stone is granite and has a height of 2.46 meters. The inscription consists of two sections of runic text and is classified as being carved in runestone style RAK. This is the classification for inscriptions where the ends of the runic bands are straight and do not have any beast or serpent heads attached. The inscription is dated as being carved in 900-960.

The runic text states that it was raised by Tóki in memory of his step-father who was either named Api or Ebbi and of his mother Tófa. It is one of only two runestones in Denmark that memorialize both parents, the second being the now-lost DR 201 from Allerup. That stepsons did not usually inherit under local law is indicated by the text, which goes on to indicate that Api/Ebbi made Tóki his heir through some process. The text also describes the father as being þægn goþan or "a good thegn," a phrase that is also used on two Swedish runestones, Vg 8 from Hjälstads and, in its plural form, on Sö 34 from Tjuvstigen. A thegn was a class of retainer, and about fifty memorial runestones in Denmark and Sweden mention that the deceased was a thegn.

The runestone, which is known locally as the Gunderup-sten 1, is currently stored at the church in Gunderup.

== Inscription ==
: tuki : raisþi : stini : þoisi : auk : karþi : kub(l) {(:) ¶ :} þausi : aft aba : mak : sin : þaikn : kuþan : auk :
{} Toki {} resþi {} stena {} þæssi {} ok {} gærþi {} kumbl {} þøsi {} æft Apa/Æbba, {} mag {} sin, {} þægn {} goþan, {} ok {}
Tóki raised these stones and made this monument in memory of Api/Ebbi, his kinsman-by-marriage, a good thane, and

: tufu : muþur : sino : þau : lika : baþi : i : þaum : hauki {: ¶} abi : uni : tuka : fiaʀ : sins : aft : sik :
{} Tofu, {} moþur {} sina. {} Þø {} liggia {} bæþi {} i {} þem {} høgi. {} Api/Æbbi {} unni {} Toka {} feaʀ {} sins {} æft {} sik. {}
Tófa, his mother. Both of them lie in this mound. Api/Ebbi granted Tóki his wealth after himself.

== See also ==
- List of runestones

== Other sources ==
- A site on Viking women.
- A site on Danish runic inscriptions from the Viking Age.
