= Östergötland Runic Inscription 165 =

Coordinates: 58°23′42″N 15°05′14″E

Östergötland Rune Inscription 165
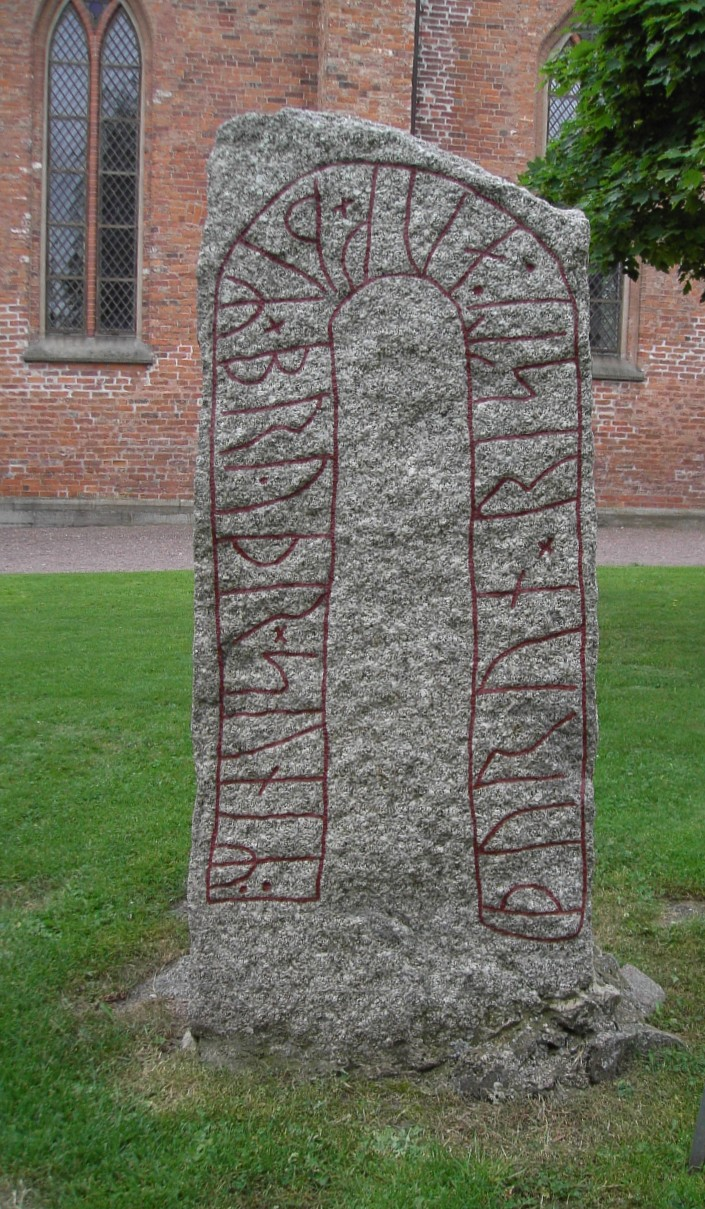
- Height: 230 centimetres (91 in)
- Width: Up to 90 centimetres (35 in)
- Discovered: 1874; Skänninge, Östergötland, Sweden
- Present location: Skänninge
- Culture: Norse
- Rundata ID: Ög 165
- Style: RAK
- Runemaster: Torkel

Text – Native
- þurun * risti * auk × þiʀ × bruþr × suniʀ : tusta × iftiʀ * sin * faþur þurkil×k rist × stin : þansi : aufti : tusta

Translation
- Torun and his brothers Toste's sons, raised (the stone) in memory of their father. I, Torkel, raised this stone in memory of Toste.

Östergötland Rune Inscription 165 (Ög 165) is a runestone located between Vårfrukyrkan (English: the Church of Our Lady) and the town square in Skänninge. It is made of grey granite and is 230 cm tall.

On the front of the runestone is the first part of the text, up until the word "suniʀ" (English: sons). It continues on the left side until the end of the text. The signature of the carver can be found on the right side. The verse is a half stanza of fornyrðislag, a form of alliterate verse which was popular in Old Norse.

The stone was discovered in recent times during repairs carried out at Vårfrukyrkan in 1874 and had been used as a threshold at the north door.

In Östergötlands runinskrifter (English: Östergötland's Runic Inscriptions) (1911), Erik Brate observed that the stone bears some resemblance to inscription Ög 87 near the Högby Church in Göstring Hundred. He speculates that Torun was the widow of Toste and that the stone was taken from there when the Church of Our Lady was built.

== See also ==
- Joint Nordic database for runic inscriptions
- Runestone
- Runic alphabet
