= Töreboda Municipality =

Töreboda Municipality Töreboda kommun
- Municipality
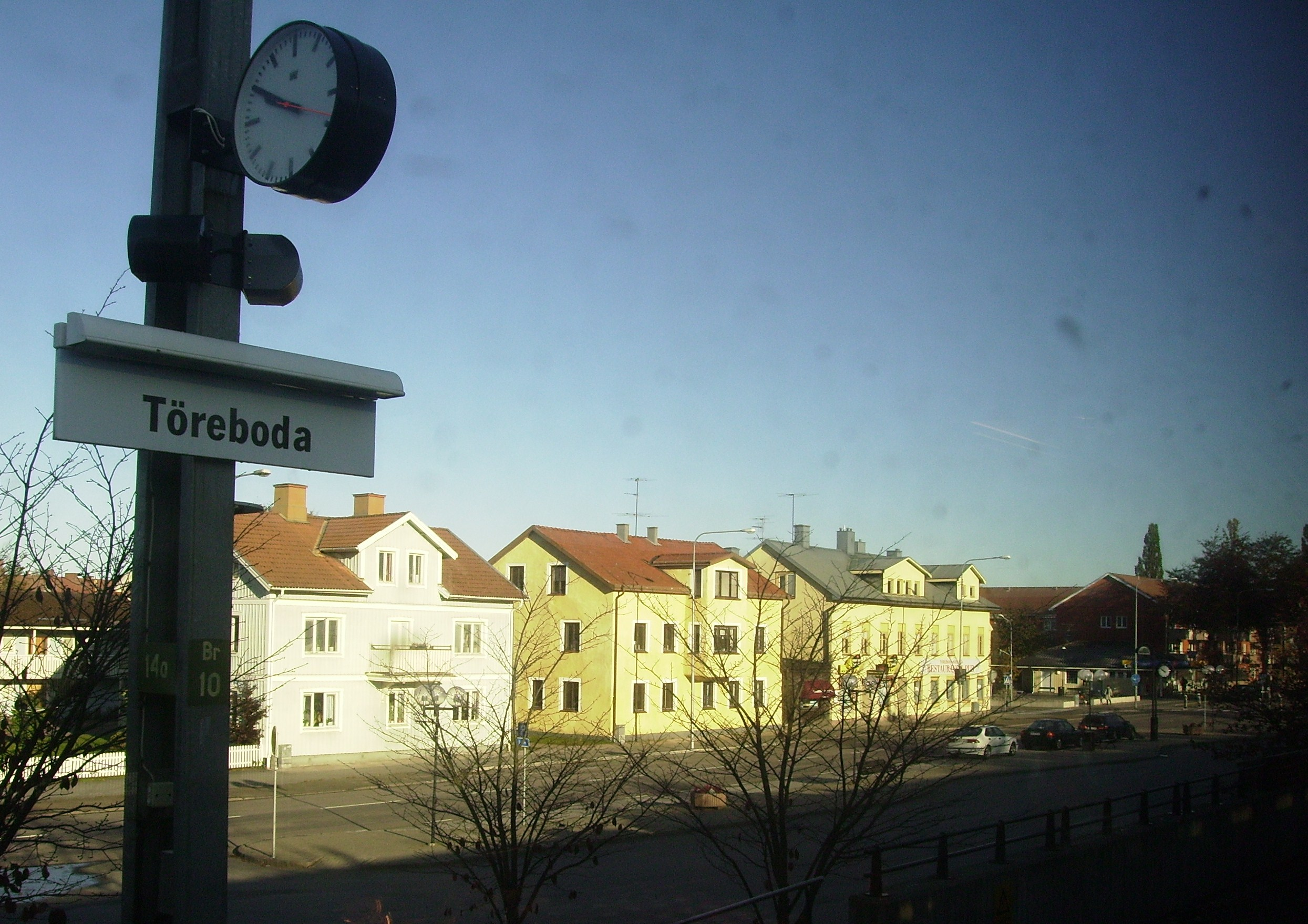

- Coat of arms

- Coordinates: 58°43′N 14°08′E
- Country: Sweden
- County: Västra Götaland County
- Seat: Töreboda

Area
  - Total: 589.5 km^{2} (227.6 sq mi)
  - Land: 539.03 km^{2} (208.12 sq mi)
  - Water: 50.47 km^{2} (19.49 sq mi)
- Area as of 1 January 2014.

Population (30 June 2025)
  - Total: 9,066
  - Density: 16.82/km^{2} (43.56/sq mi)
- Time zone: UTC+1 (CET)
  - Summer (DST): UTC+2 (CEST)
- ISO 3166 code: SE
- Province: Västergötland
- Municipal code: 1473
- Website: www.toreboda.se

Töreboda Municipality (Swedish: Töreboda kommun) is a municipality in Västra Götaland County in western Sweden. Its seat is located in the town of Töreboda and it includes the population centers of Älgarås and Moholm.

The present municipality was formed in 1971, when the market town (köping) of Töreboda (itself instituted in 1909) was amalgamated with Moholm and parts of Undenäs and Hova.

== Demographics ==
This is a demographic table based on Töreboda Municipality's electoral districts in the 2022 Swedish general election sourced from SVT's election platform, in turn taken from SCB official statistics.

In total there were 9,180 residents, including 7,055 Swedish citizens of voting age. 42.6% voted for the left coalition and 55.2% for the right coalition. Indicators are in percentage points except population totals and income.

Location	Residents	Citizen adults	Left vote	Right vote	Employed	Swedish parents	Foreign heritage	Income SEK	Degree
Location			%	%					
Björkäng	2,019	1,558	44.6	52.3	68	75	25	18,443	23
Kilen	2,241	1,675	46.5	52.5	86	91	9	25,785	32
Kårtorp	1,525	1,172	44.8	53.8	73	73	27	21,422	30
Moholm	1,939	1,525	37.4	61.0	78	87	13	23,288	29
Älgarås	1,456	1,125	37.6	58.8	77	88	12	20,327	26
Source: SVT
