= Töreboda =

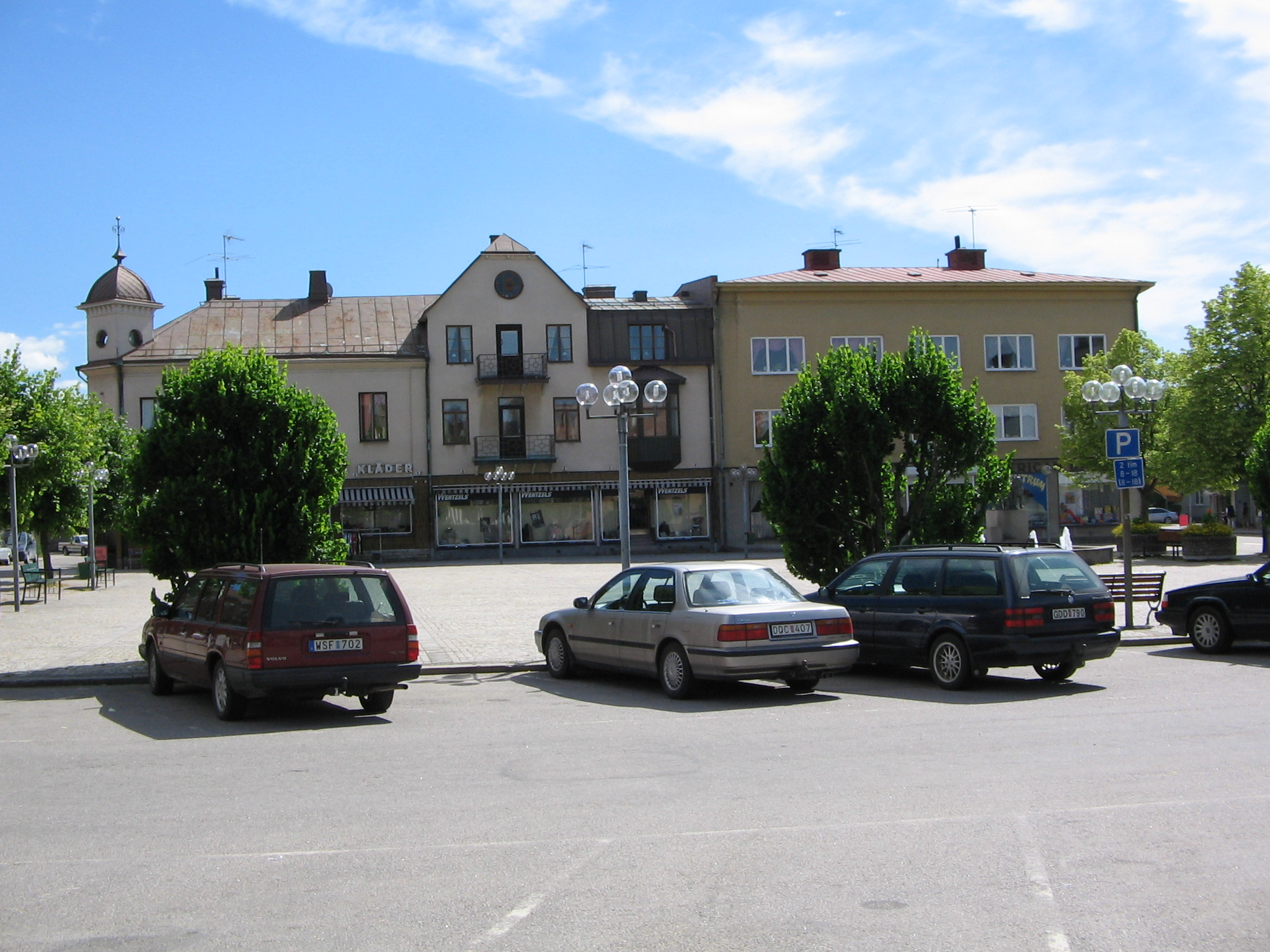
- Central Töreboda

- Location within Västra Götaland Location within Sweden
- Coordinates: 58°43′N 14°08′E
- Country: Sweden
- Province: Västergötland
- County: Västra Götaland County
- Municipality: Töreboda Municipality

Area
  - Total: 3.64 km^{2} (1.41 sq mi)

Population (31 December 2010)
  - Total: 4,189
  - Density: 1,151/km^{2} (2,980/sq mi)
- Time zone: UTC+1 (CET)
  - Summer (DST): UTC+2 (CEST)
- Climate: Dfb

Töreboda is a locality and the seat of Töreboda Municipality, Västra Götaland County, Sweden with 4,189 inhabitants in 2010. Every three years since 2000, a festival has been held at the beginning of July. Töreboda is the hometown for worldwide famous punkband Asta Kask.
