= Älgarås =

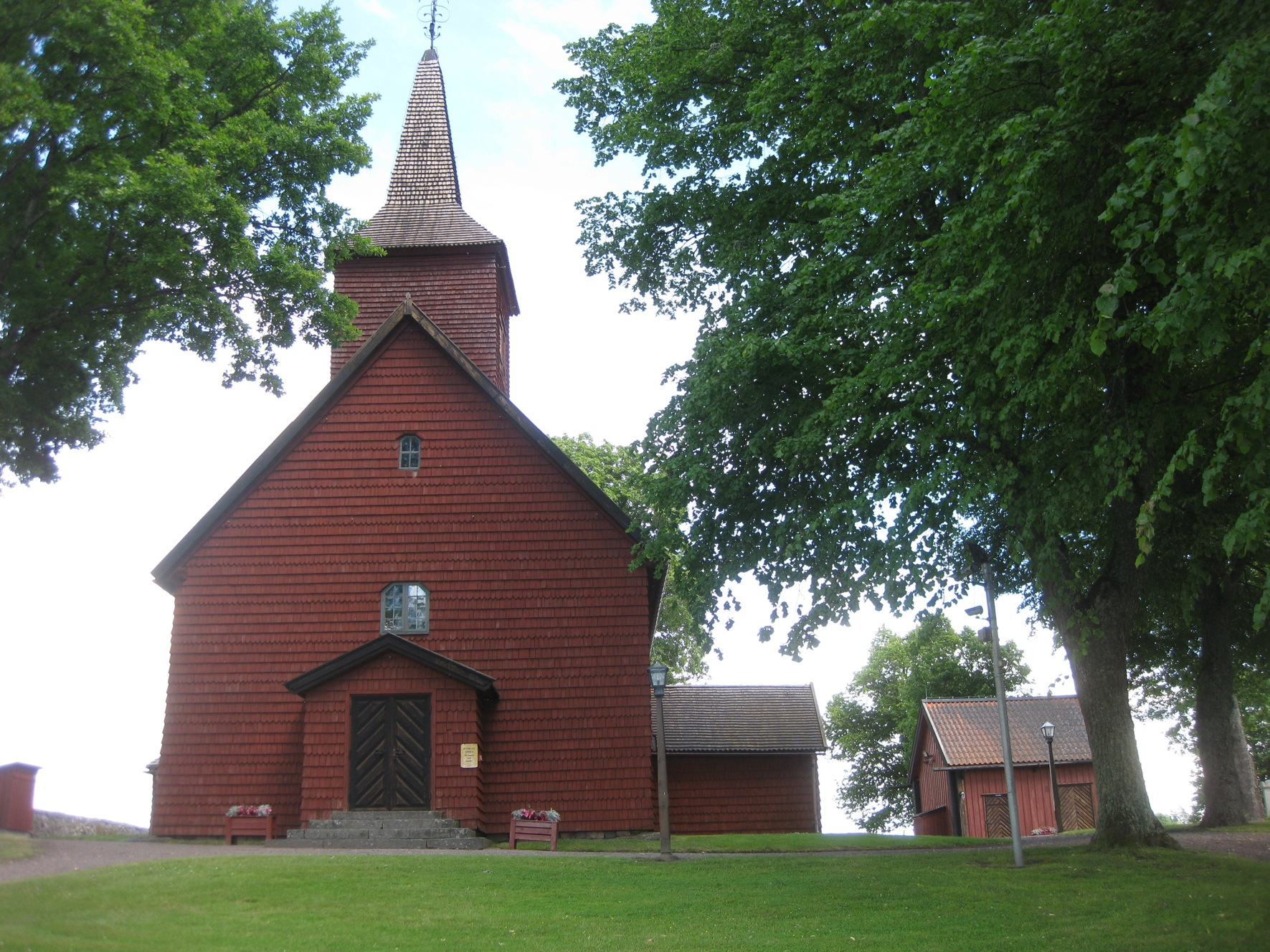
- The church in Älgarås

- Location within Västra Götaland Location within Sweden
- Coordinates: 58°49′N 14°15′E
- Country: Sweden
- Province: Västergötland
- County: Västra Götaland County
- Municipality: Töreboda Municipality

Area
  - Total: 0.97 km^{2} (0.37 sq mi)

Population (31 December 2010)
  - Total: 417
  - Density: 430/km^{2} (1,100/sq mi)
- Time zone: UTC+1 (CET)
  - Summer (DST): UTC+2 (CEST)
- Climate: Dfb

Älgarås (Swedish pronunciation: [ˈɛ̂lːjarˌoːs]) is a locality situated in Töreboda Municipality, Västra Götaland County, Sweden with 417 inhabitants in 2010. The battle of Älgarås, between the House of Sverker and House of Erik took place here in 1205, securing the crown for Sverker II of Sweden for some more years, until the battle of Lena in 1208.
