= Moholm =

- Location within Västra Götaland Location within Sweden
- Coordinates: 58°37′N 14°02′E
- Country: Sweden
- Province: Västergötland
- County: Västra Götaland County
- Municipality: Töreboda Municipality

Area
  - Total: 1.08 km^{2} (0.42 sq mi)

Population (31 December 2010)
  - Total: 640
  - Density: 594/km^{2} (1,540/sq mi)
- Time zone: UTC+1 (CET)
  - Summer (DST): UTC+2 (CEST)
- Climate: Dfb

Moholm (Swedish pronunciation: [mʊˈhɔlm]) is a locality situated in Töreboda Municipality, Västra Götaland County, Sweden with 640 inhabitants in 2010.
