= Runestone styles =

Overview of runestone design

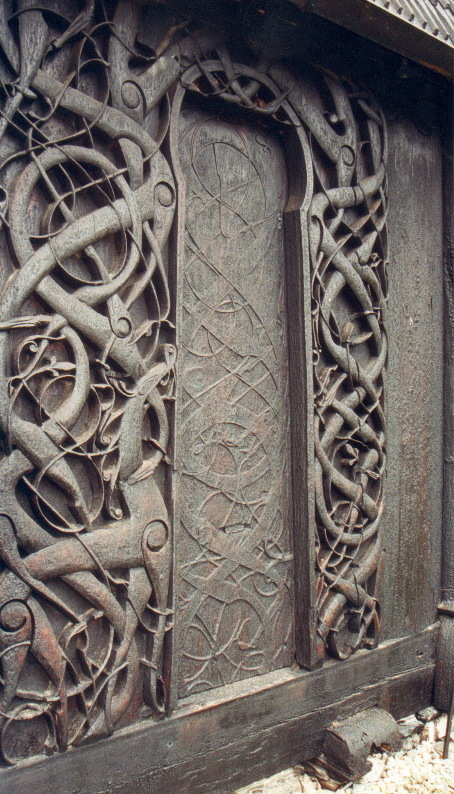
The runestone styles were part of the general evolution of art in Scandinavia. This is a part of the decoration of the Urnes stave church which is in the same as the later runestone styles.

The term "runestone style" in the singular may refer to the Urnes style.

The style or design of runestones varied during the Viking Age. The early runestones were simple in design, but towards the end of the runestone era they became increasingly complex and made by travelling runemasters such as Öpir and Visäte.

A categorization of the styles was developed by Anne-Sophie Gräslund in the 1990s. Her systematization is considered to have been a break-through and is today a standard. The styles are RAK, Fp, Pr1, Pr2, Pr3, Pr4 and Pr5, and they cover the period 980-1130, which was the period during which most runestones were made.

The styles Pr1 and Pr2 correspond to the Ringerike style, whereas Pr3, Pr4 and Pr5 belong to what is more widely known as the Urnes style.

Below follows a brief presentation of the various styles by showing sample runestones according to Rundata's annotation.

== RAK ==
RAK is the oldest style and covers the period 980-1015 AD, but the Rundata project also includes the older runestones in this group, as well as younger ones. This style has no dragon heads and the ends of the runic bands are straight.

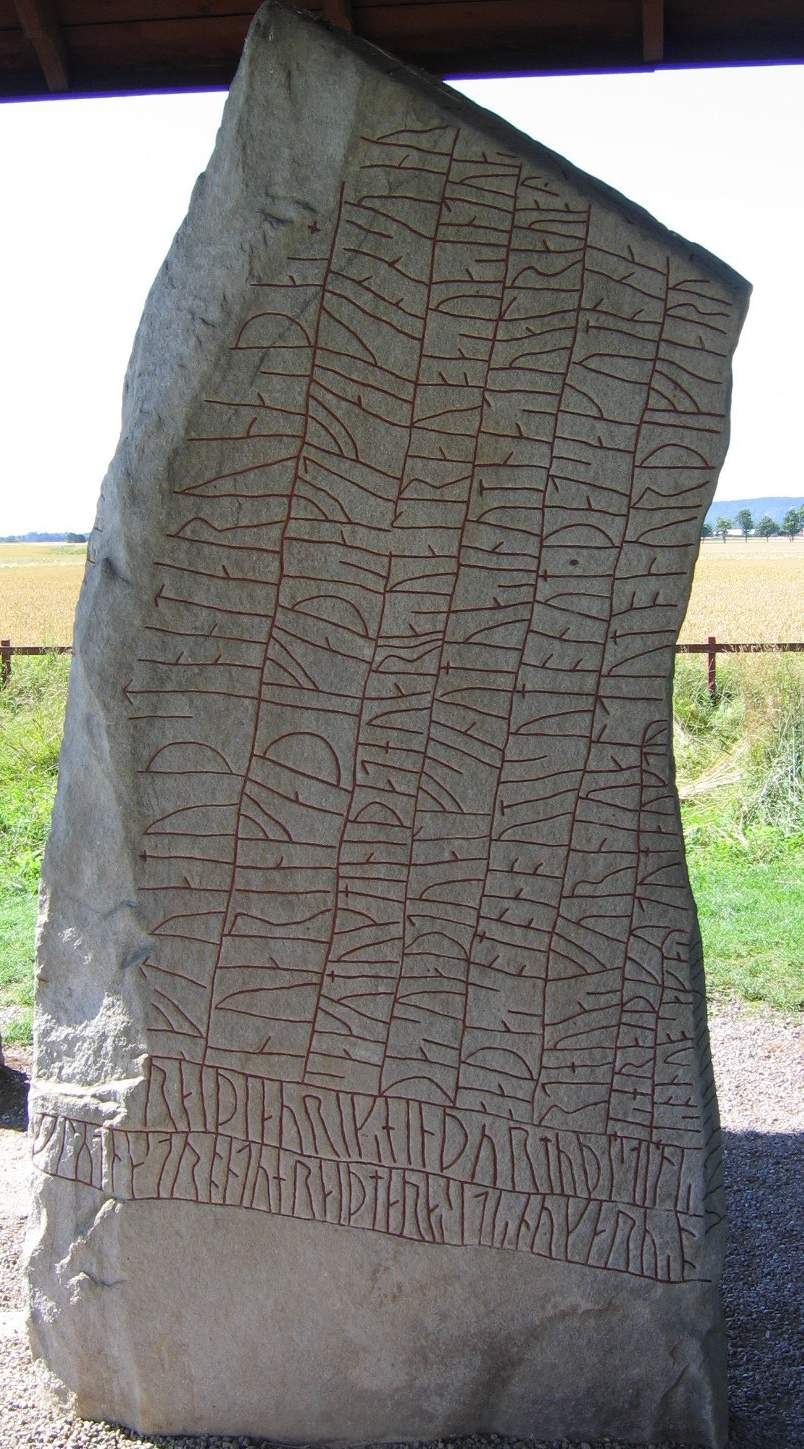
Rök runestone

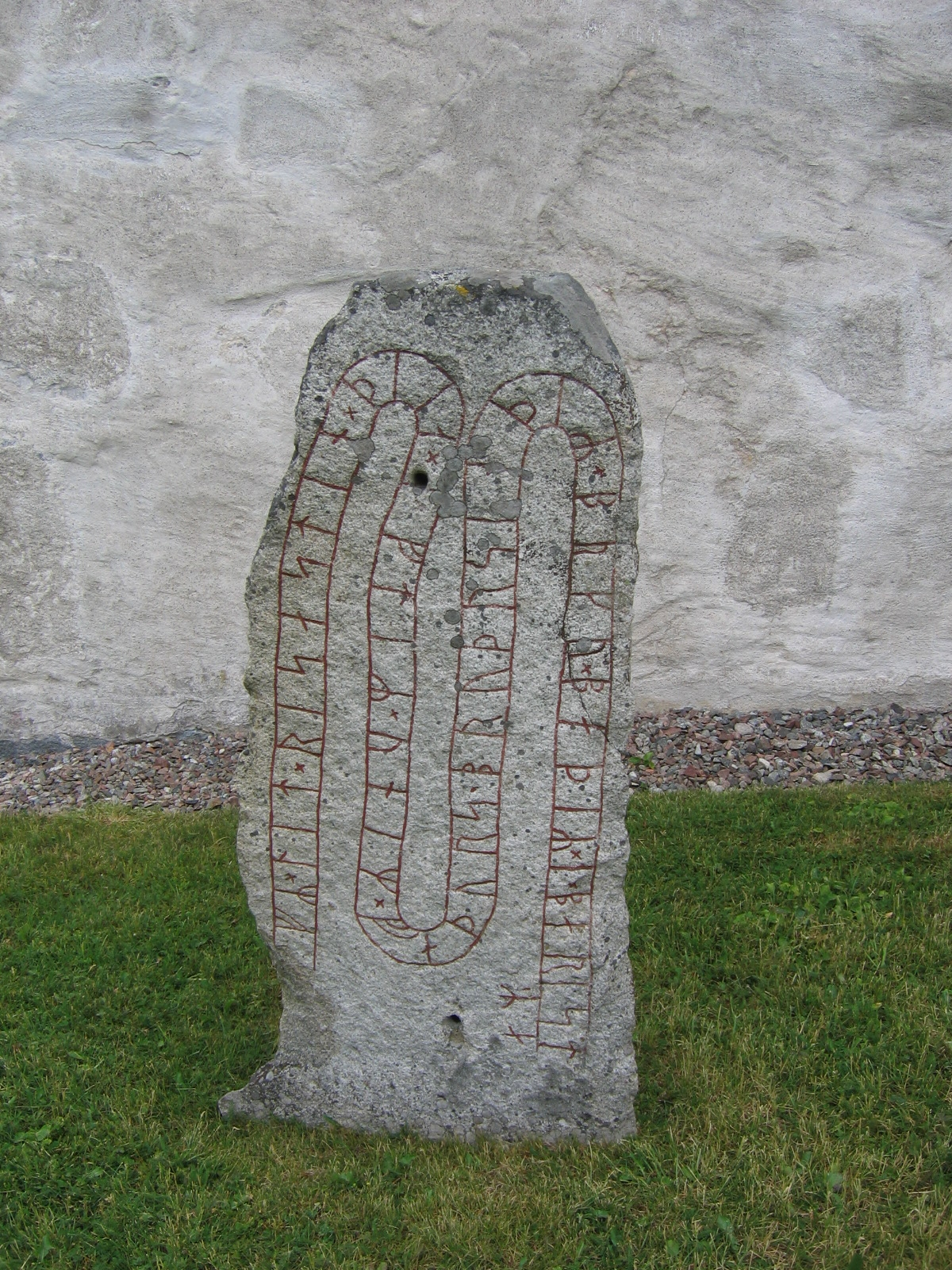
U 336

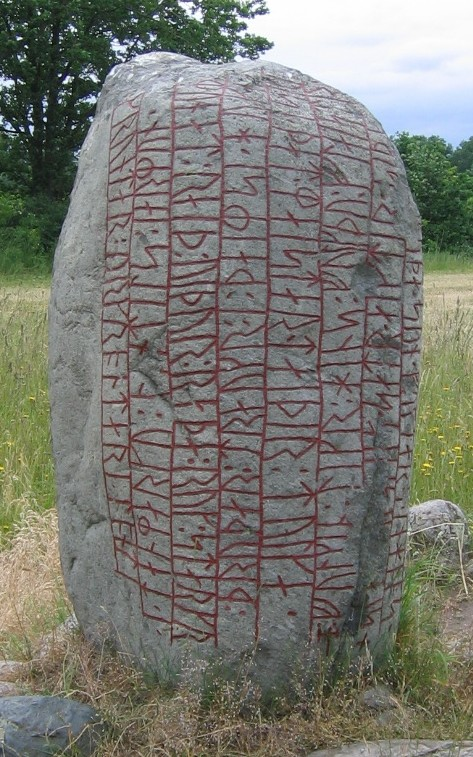
Karlevi Runestone

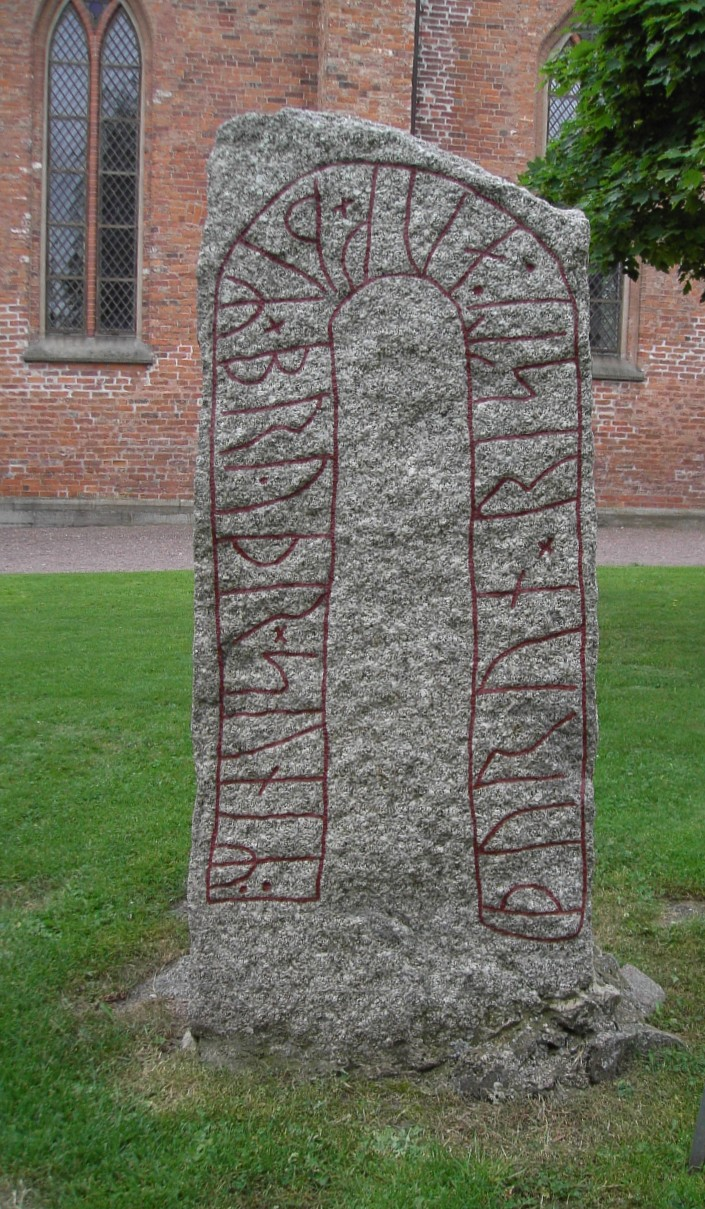
Ög 165

== Fp (Birds-eye view) ==
This style is from the period c. 1010/1015 to c. 1040/1050, when Pr3 appeared. It is characterized by runic bands that end with animal heads seen from above.

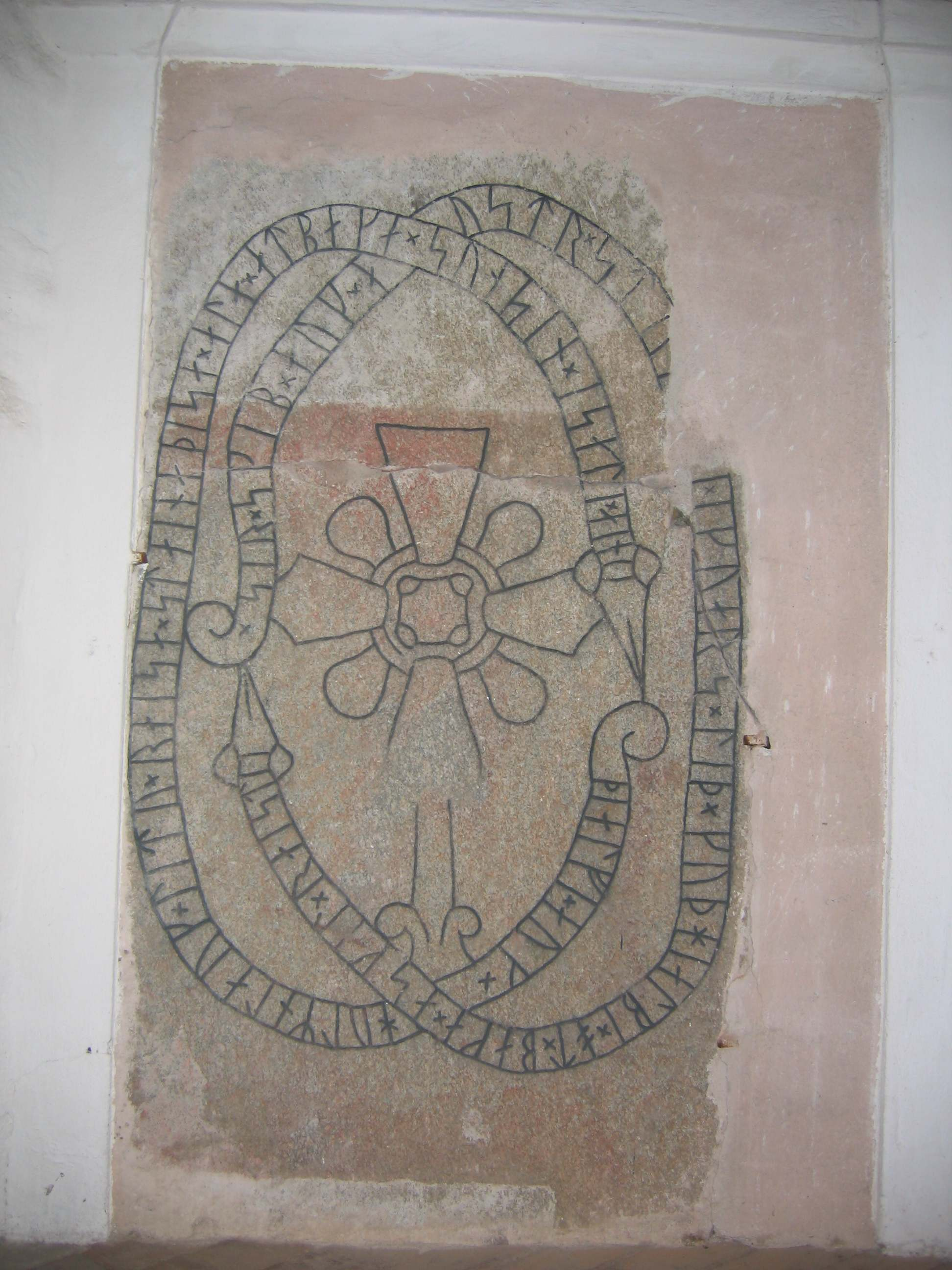
U 778

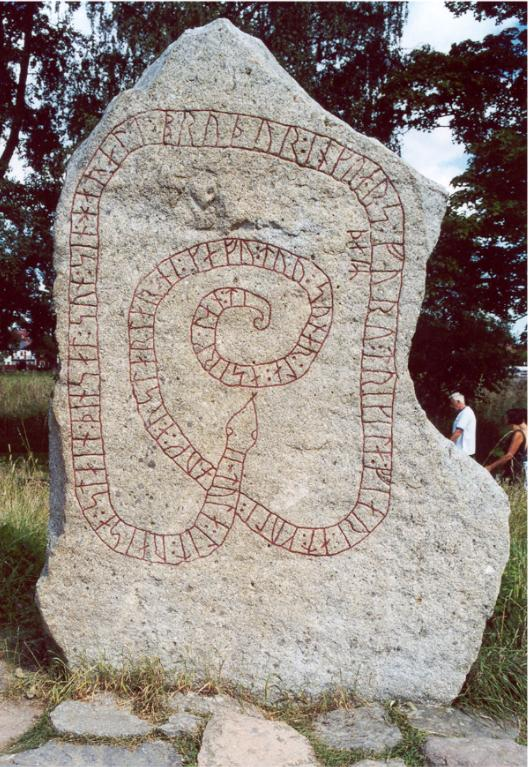
Gripsholm Runestone

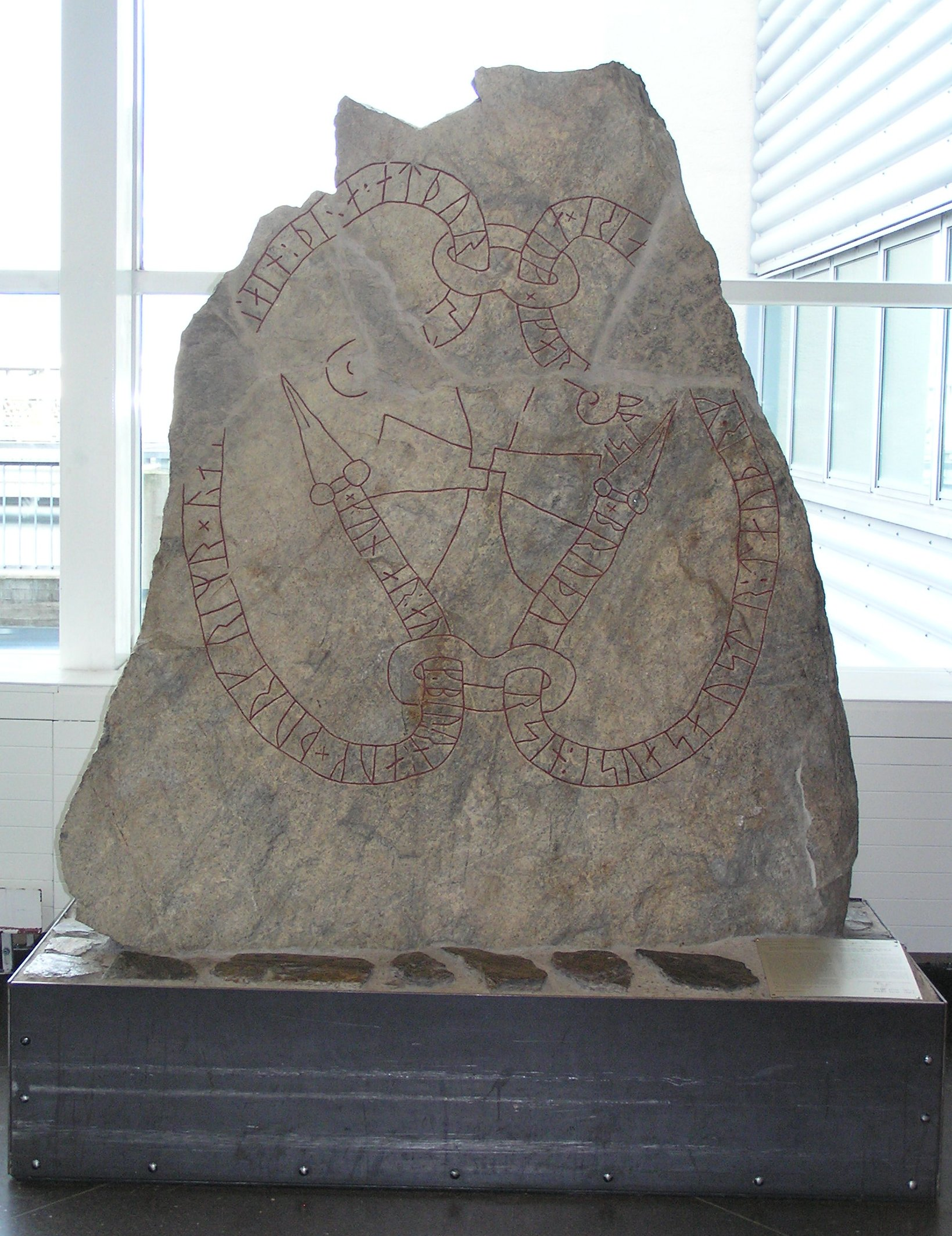
U FV 1992;157

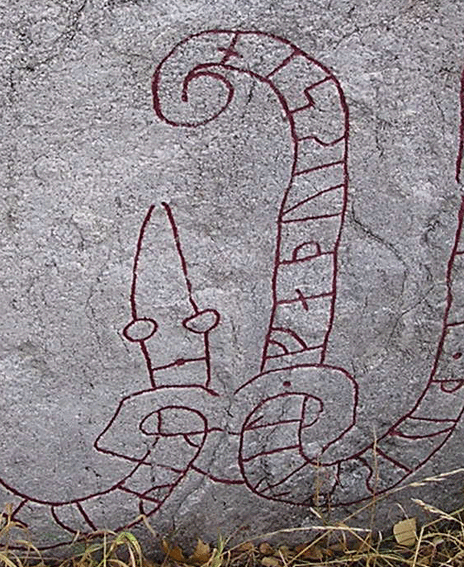
Sö 194

== Pr (profile styles) ==
In the styles called Pr1, Pr2, Pr3, Pr4 and Pr5, the runic bands end with animal heads seen in profile.

=== Pr1 (Ringerike style) ===
This style is contemporary with FP dated to c. 1010- c. 1050 when it was succeeded by Pr3.

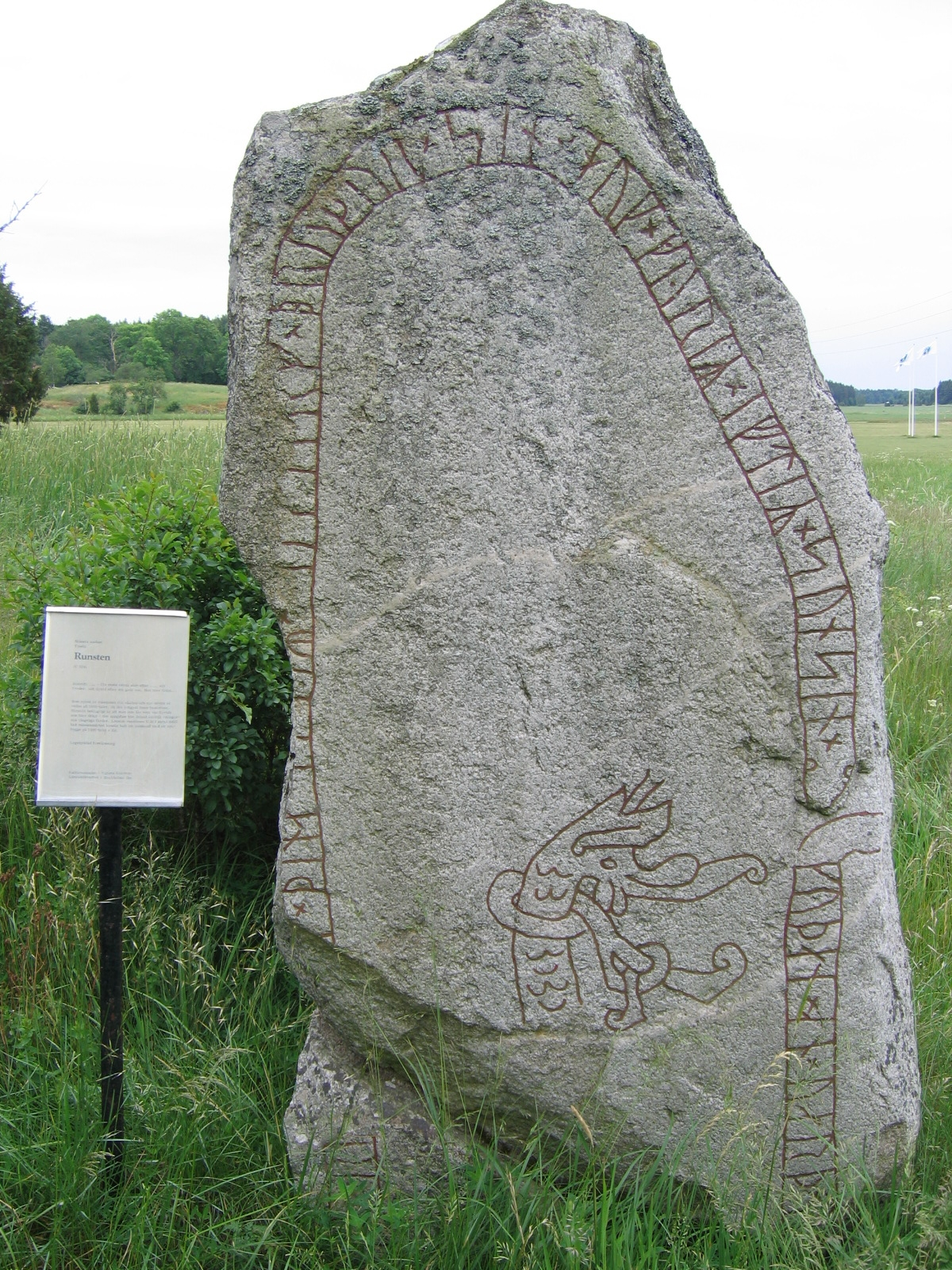
U 324

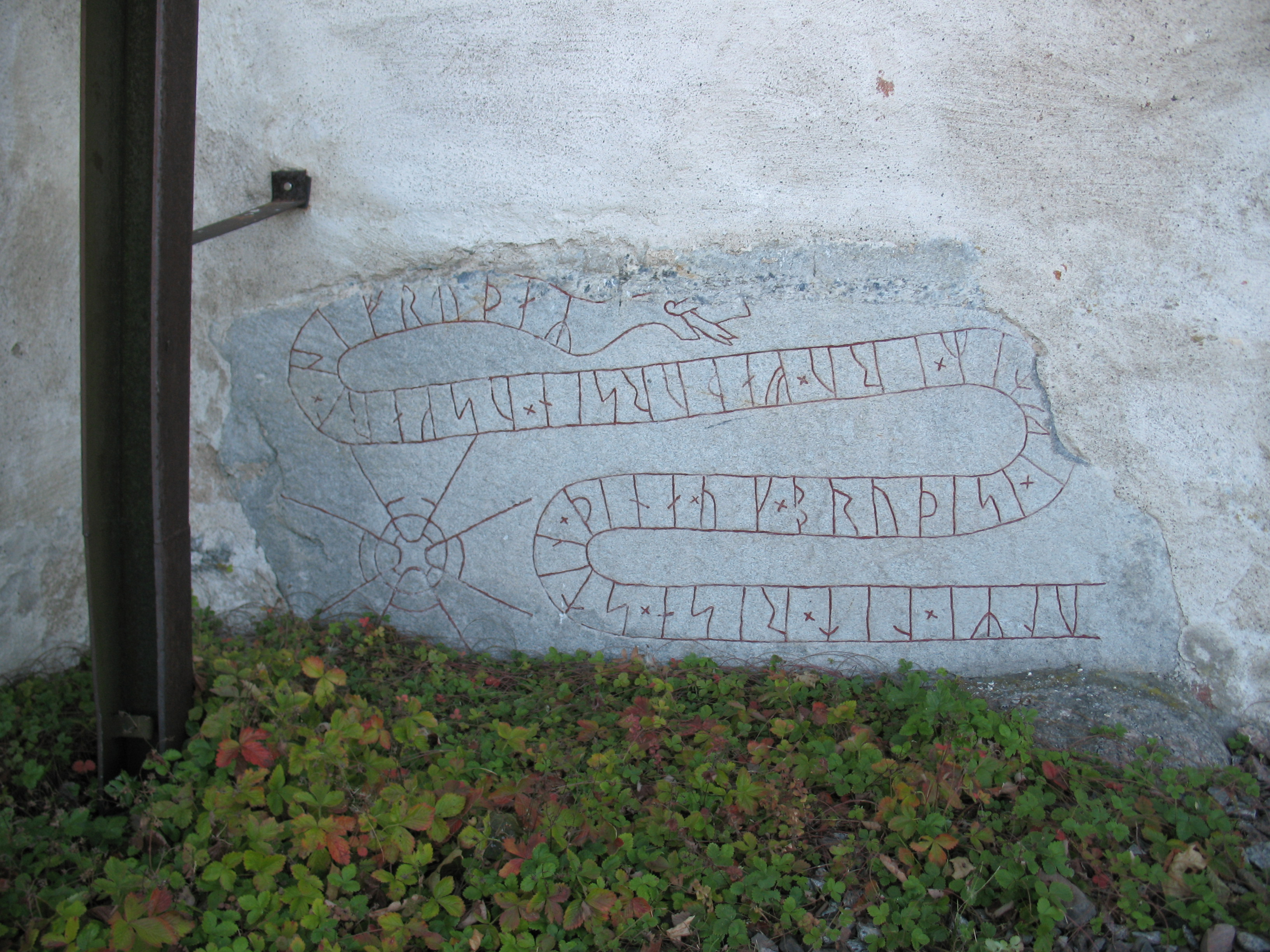
U 335

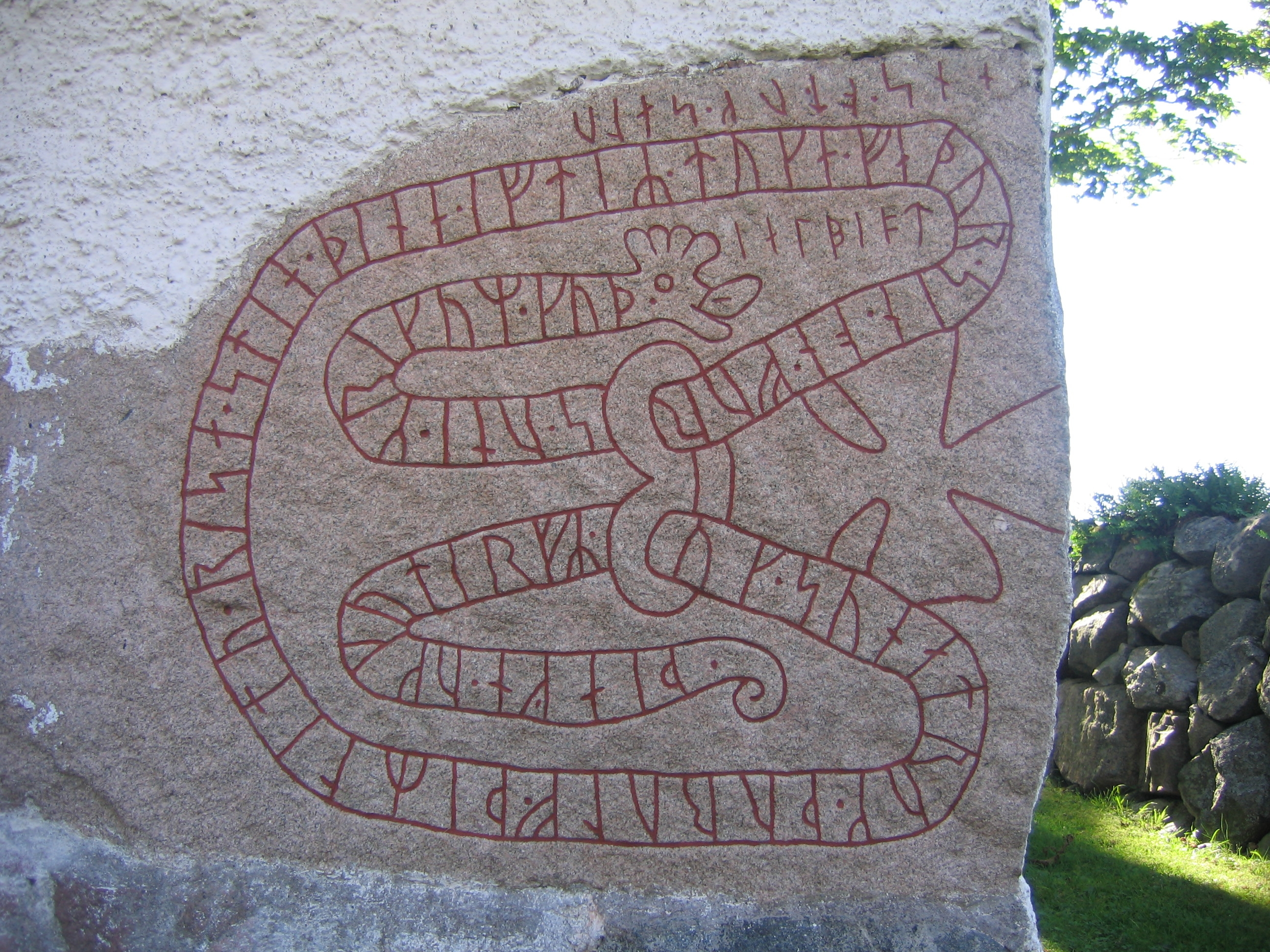
U 201

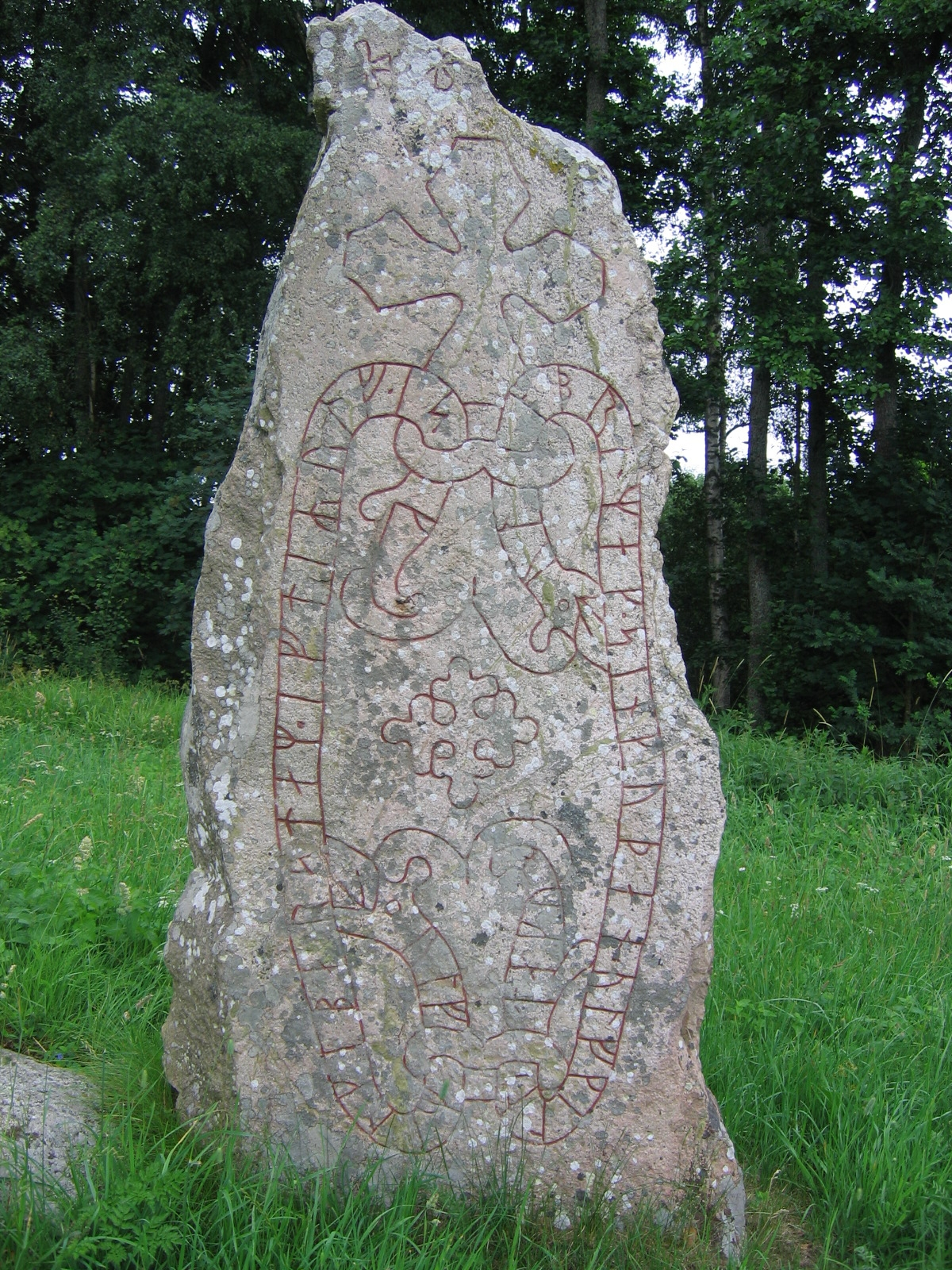
U 161

=== Pr2 (Ringerike style) ===
This style is only somewhat younger than the previous style and it is dated to c. 1020- c. 1050, and it was also succeeded by Pr3.

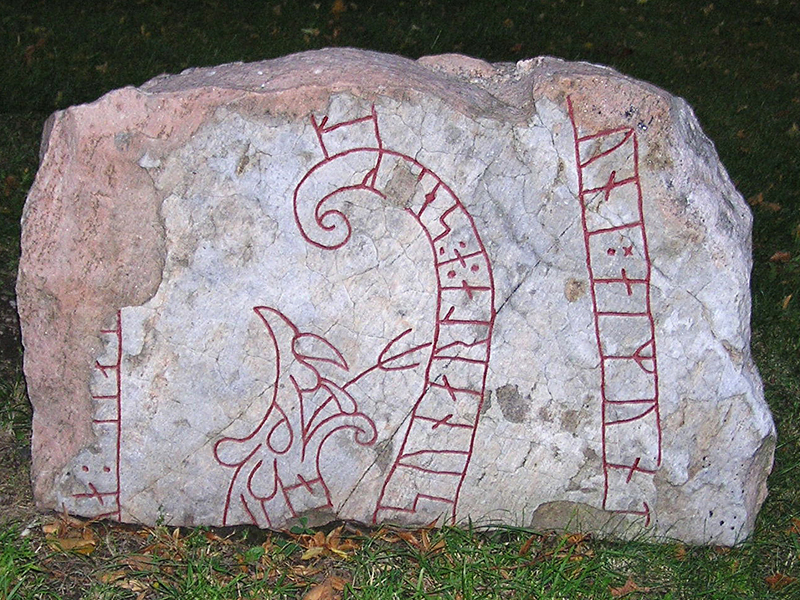
Sö 279

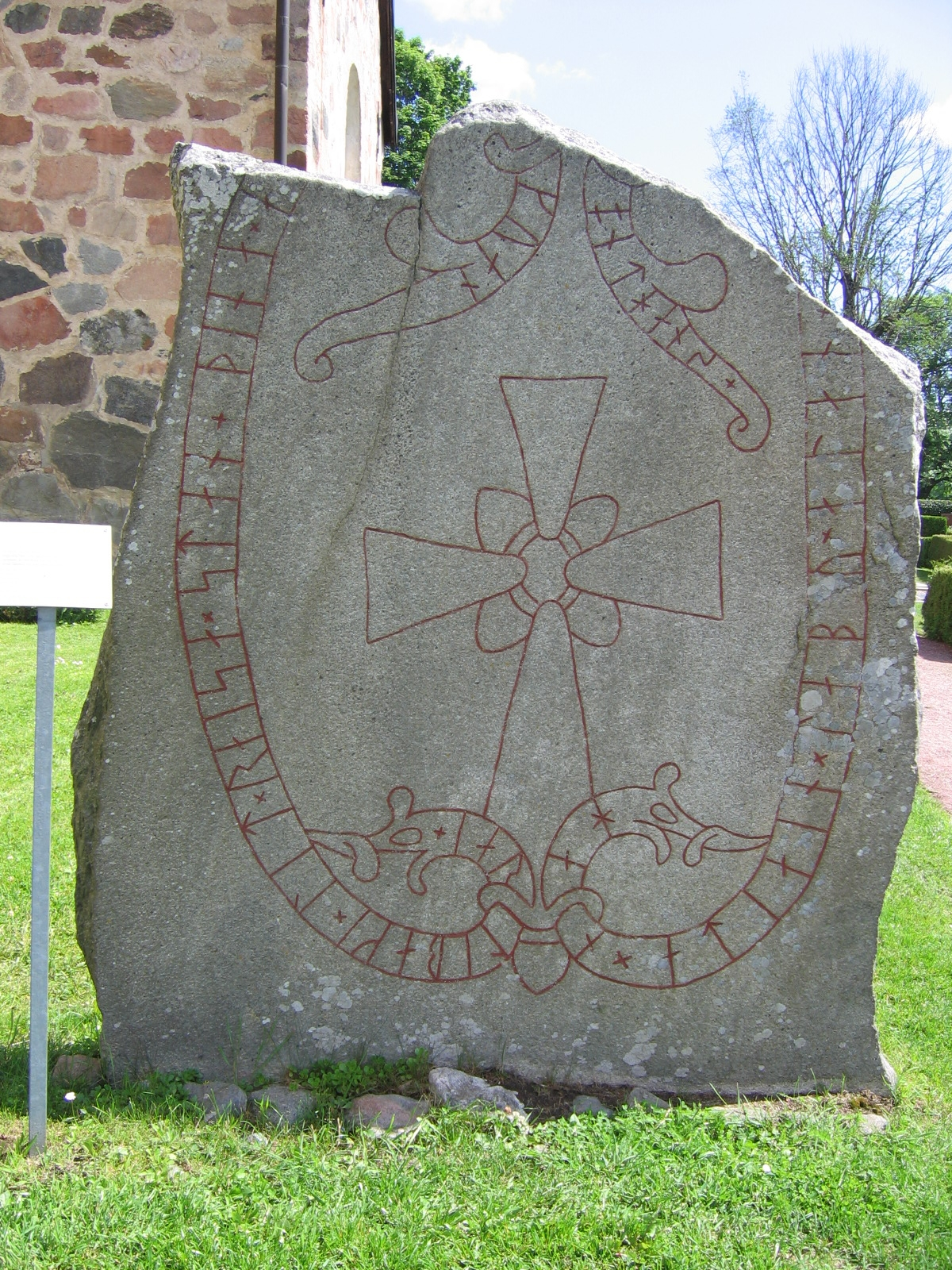
U 212

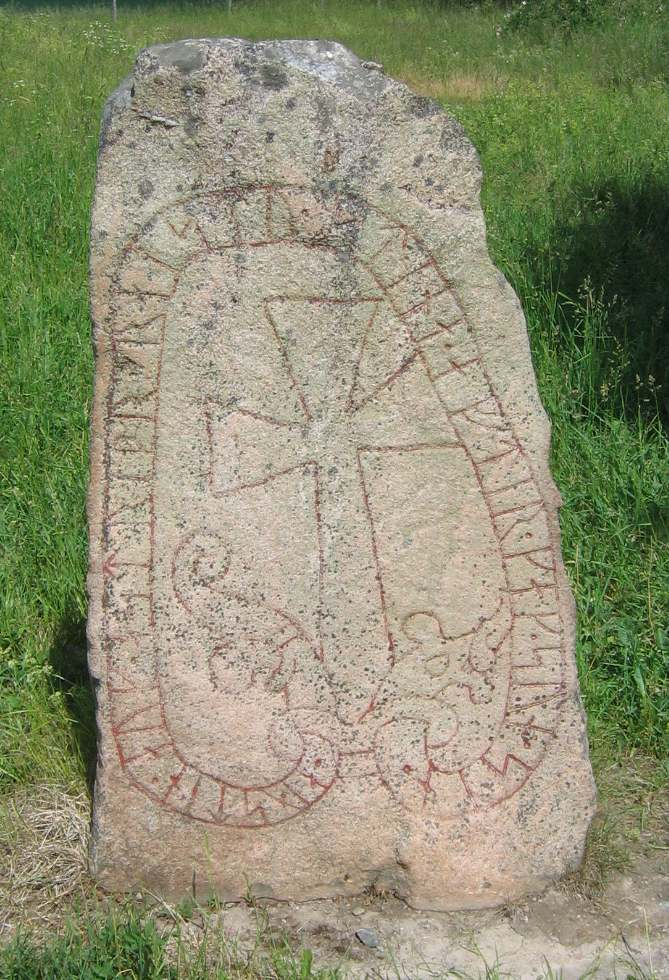
U 137

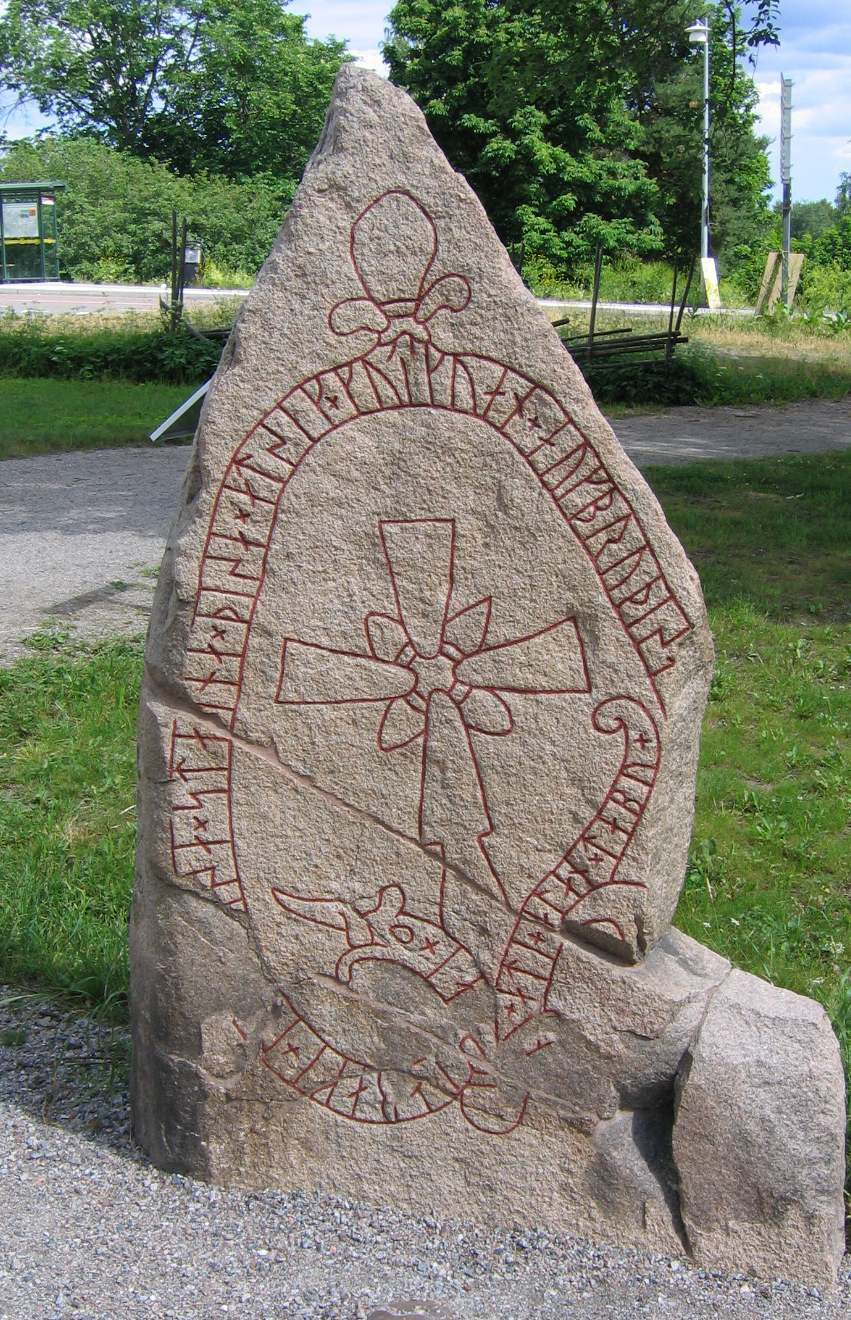
U 165

=== Pr3 (Urnes style) ===
This style succeeded FP, Pr1 and Pr2 and is dated to c. 1050- c. 1080.

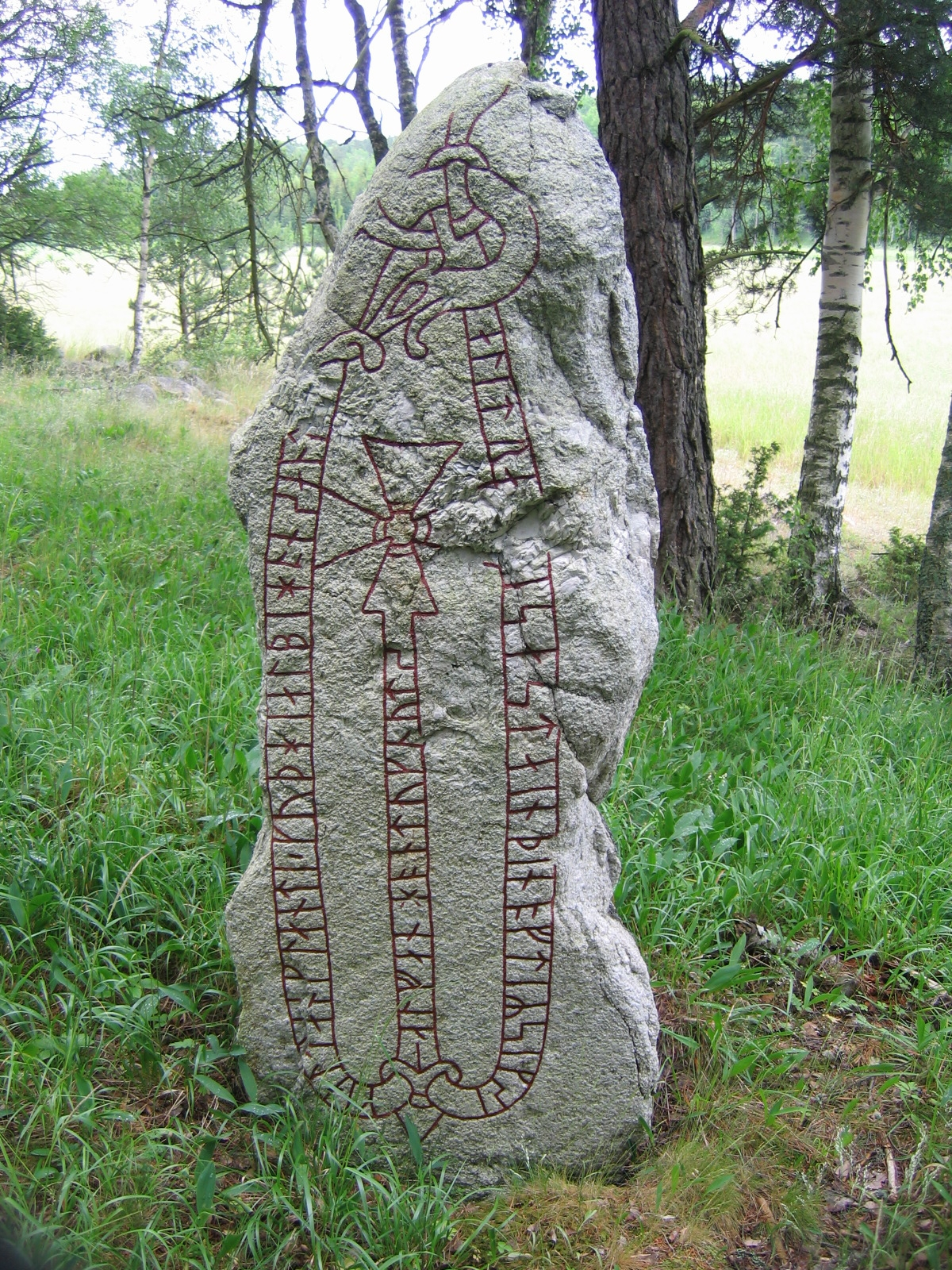
U 194

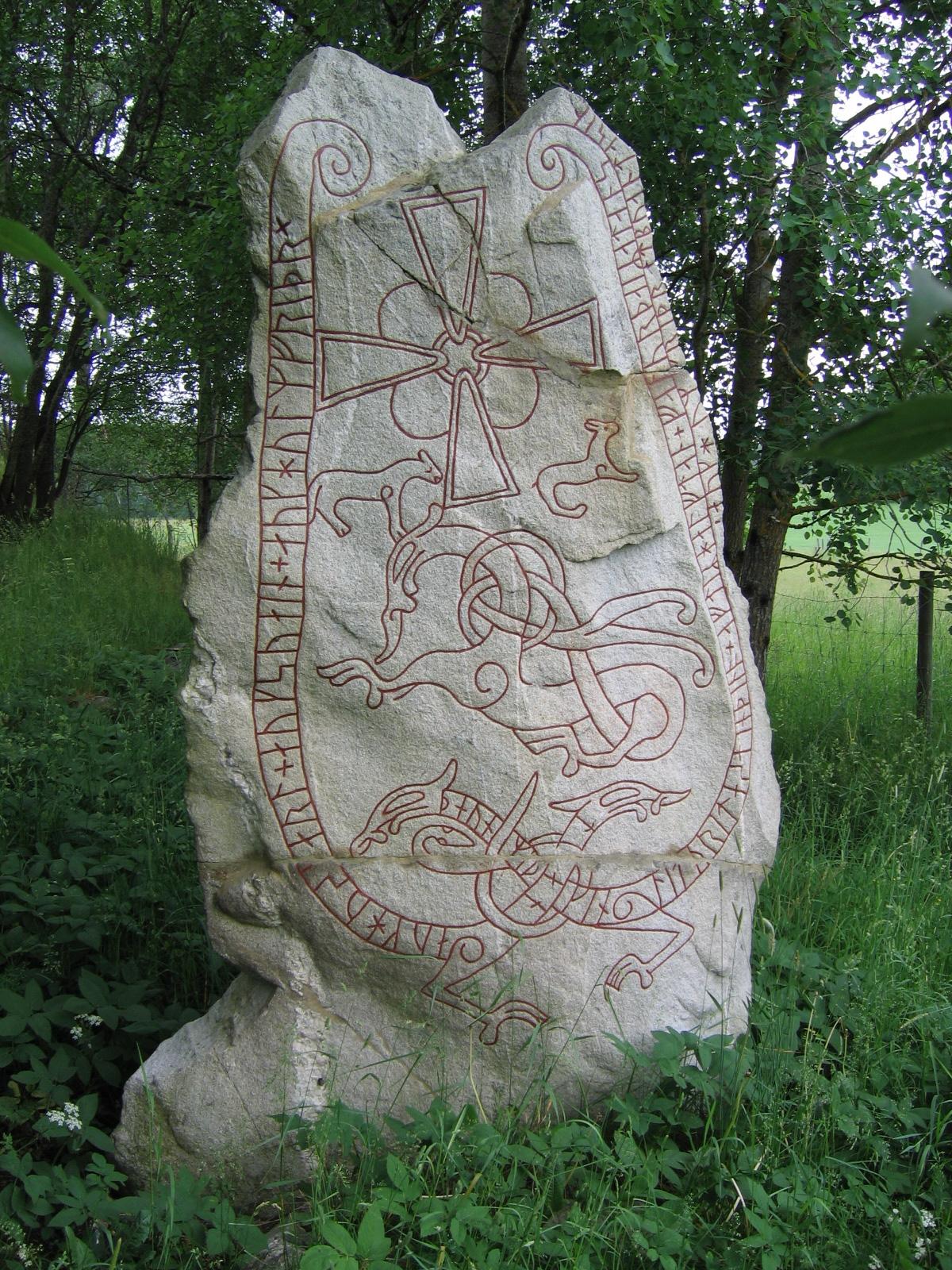
U 240

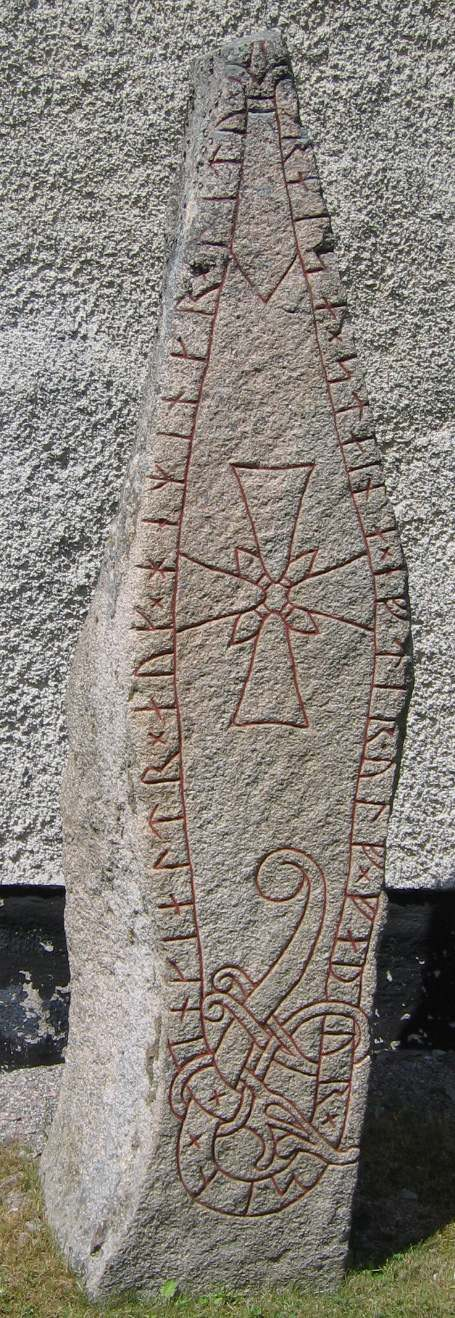
U 256

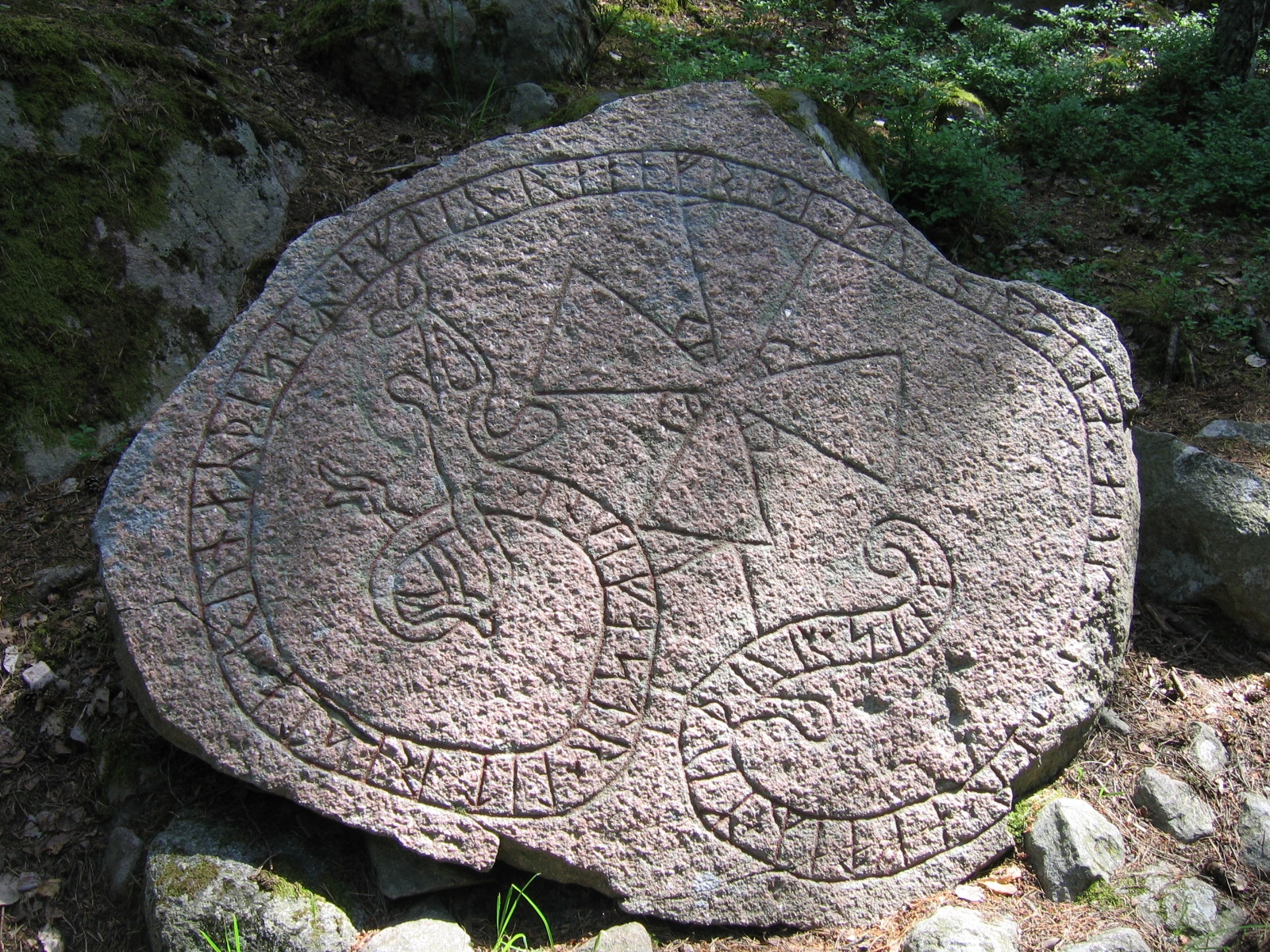
U 148

=== Pr4 (Urnes style) ===
This style appeared somewhat later c. 1060/1070 and lasted until c. 1100.

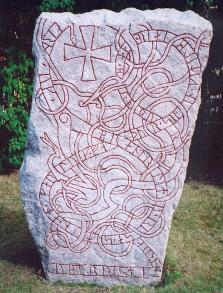
U Fv1976;107

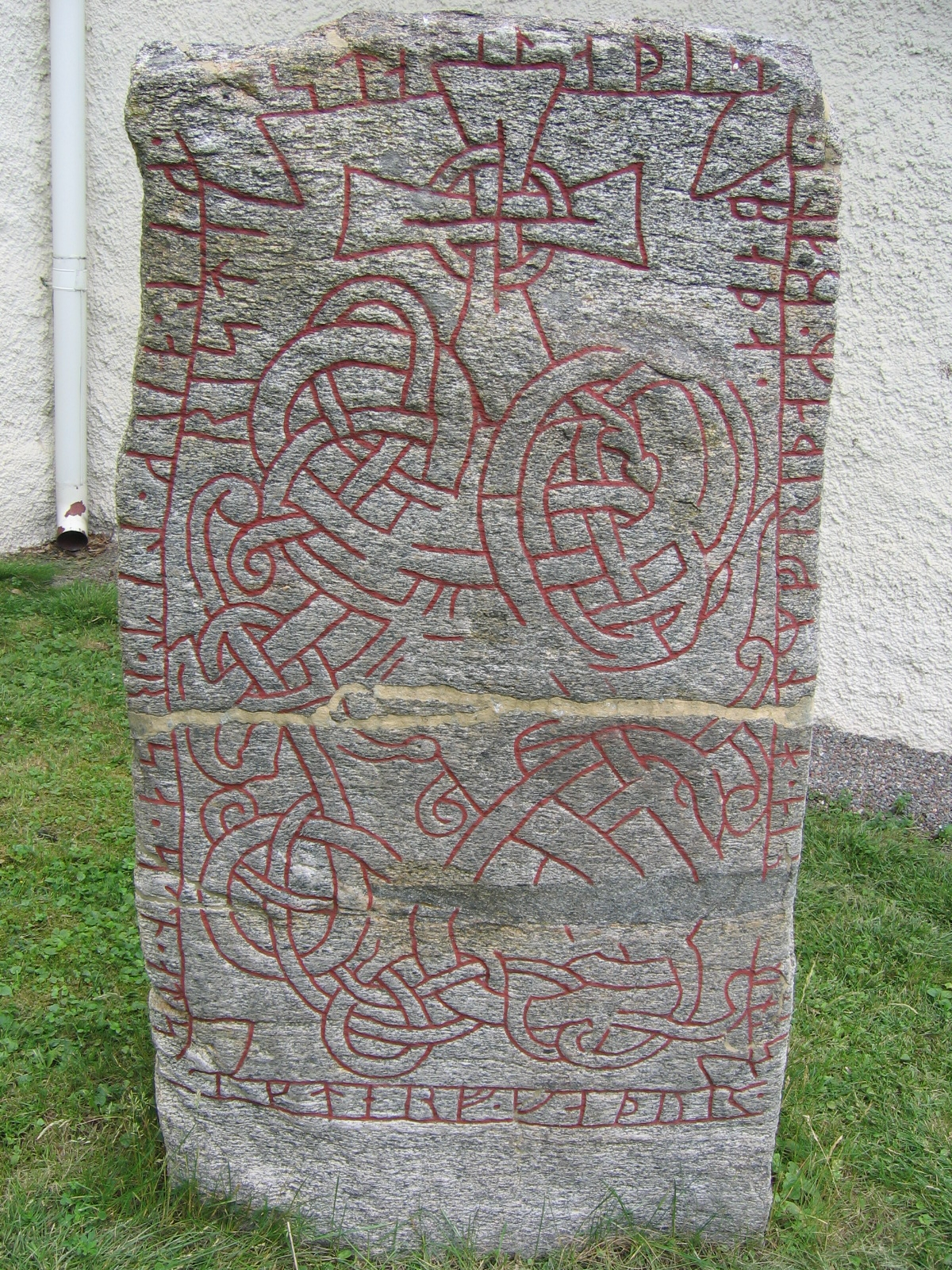
U 647

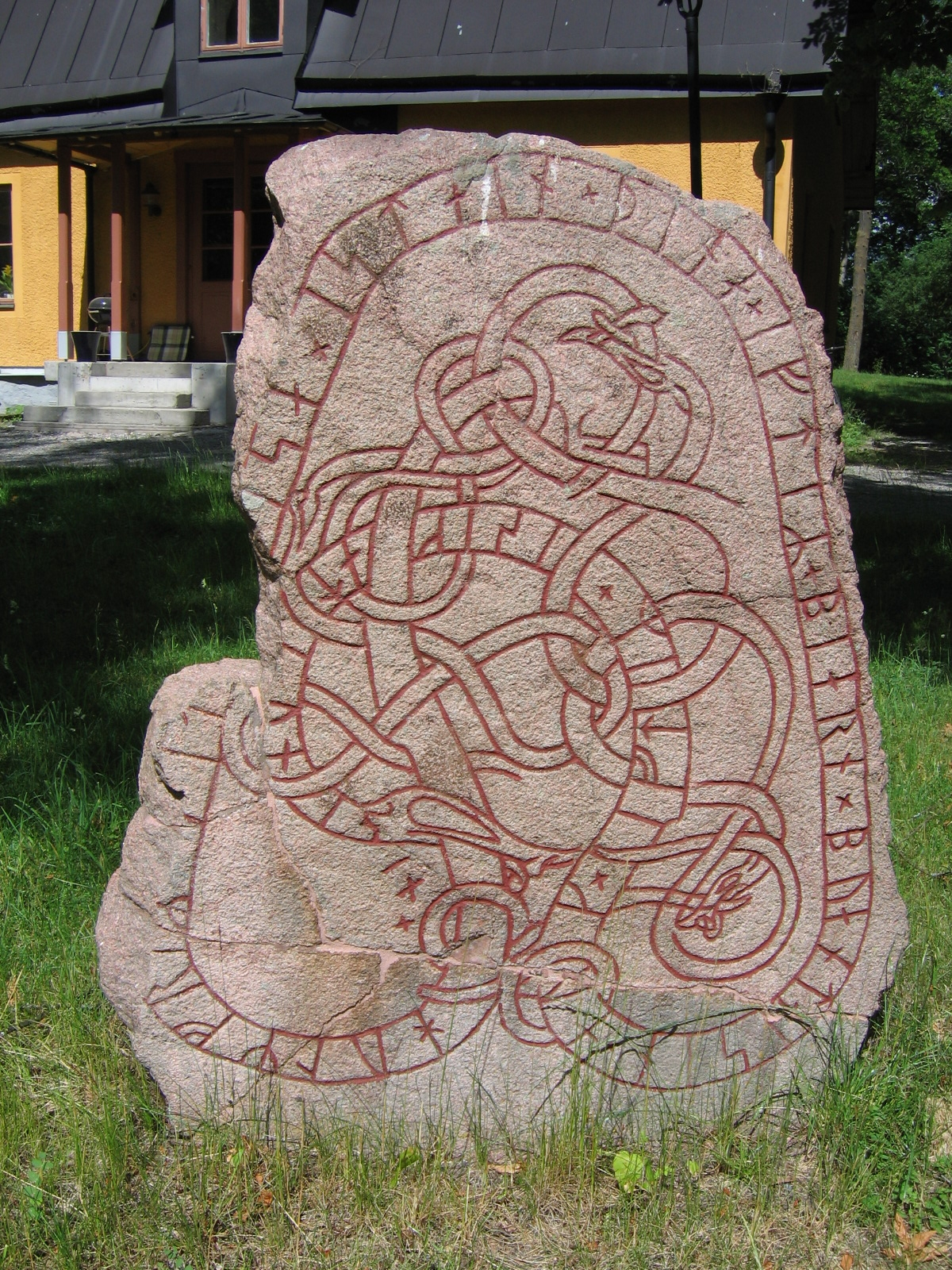
U 152

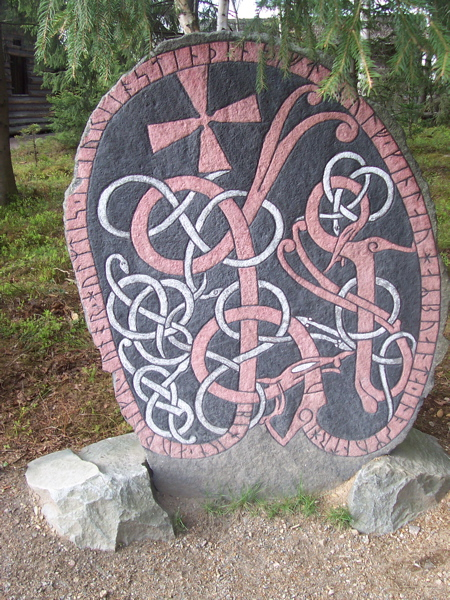
U 871

=== Pr5 (Urnes style) ===
This style was the last one before runestones stopped being raised. It appeared c. 1080/1100 and lasted until c. 1130.

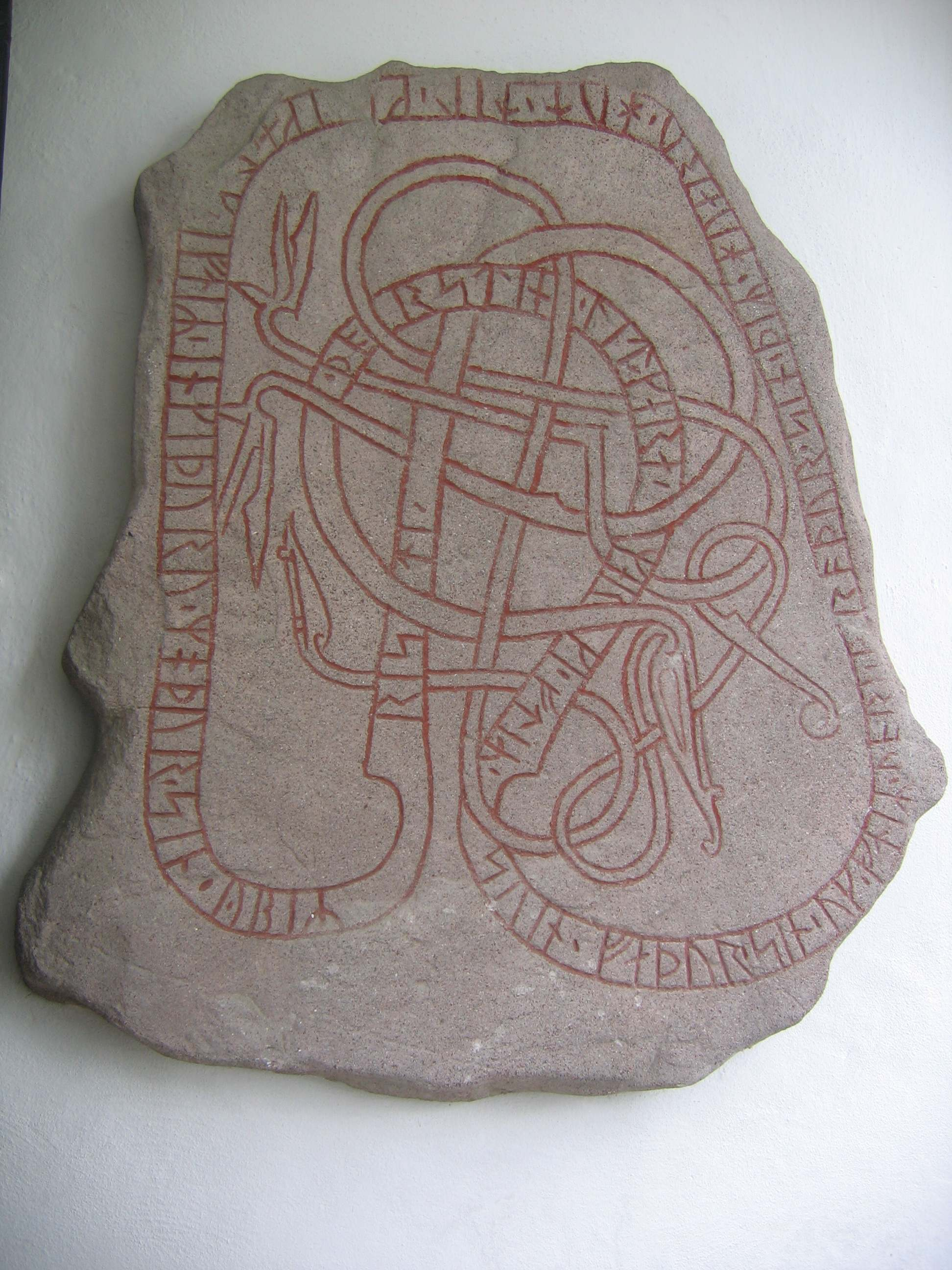
U 104

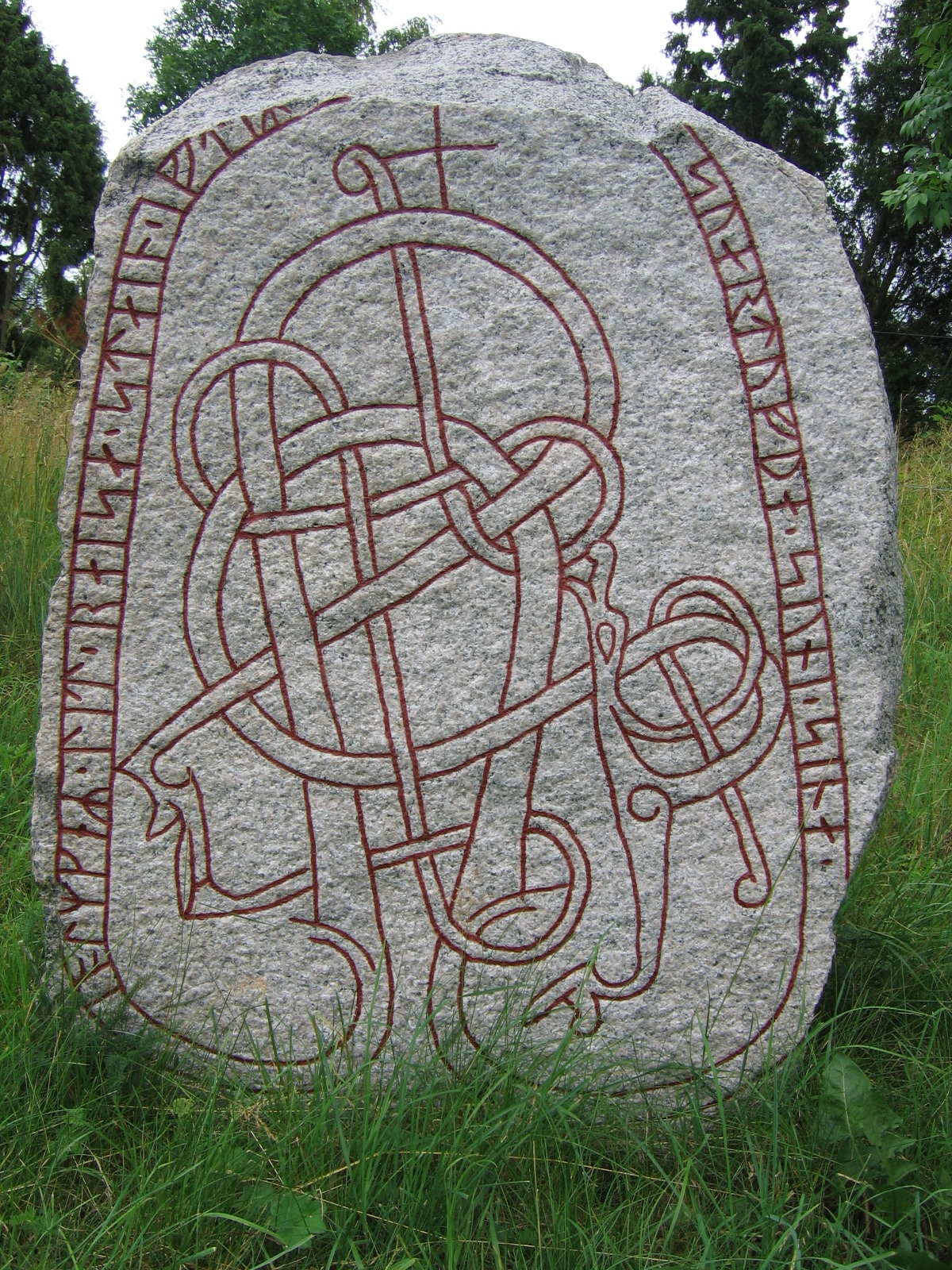
U 1014

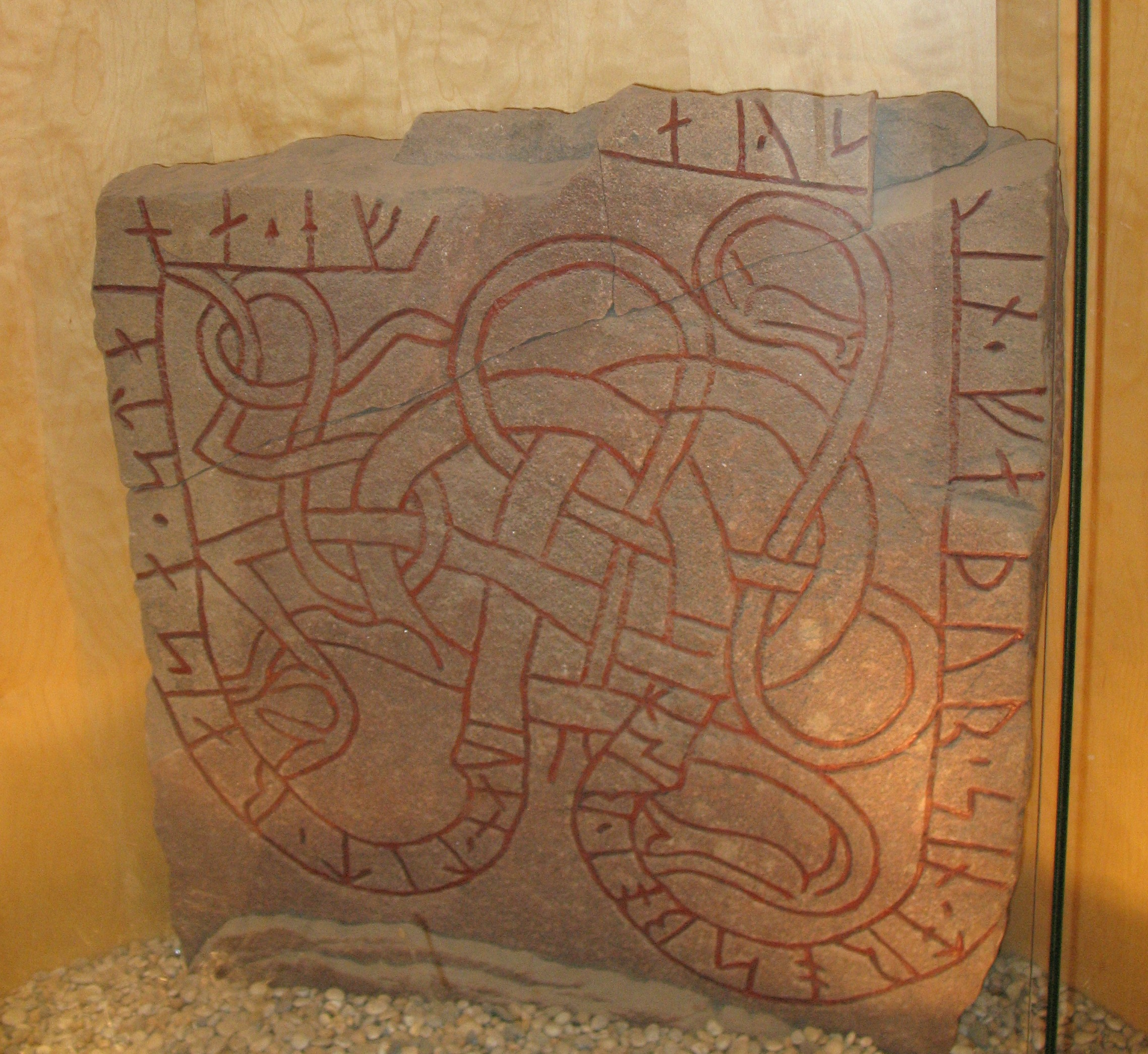
U 216

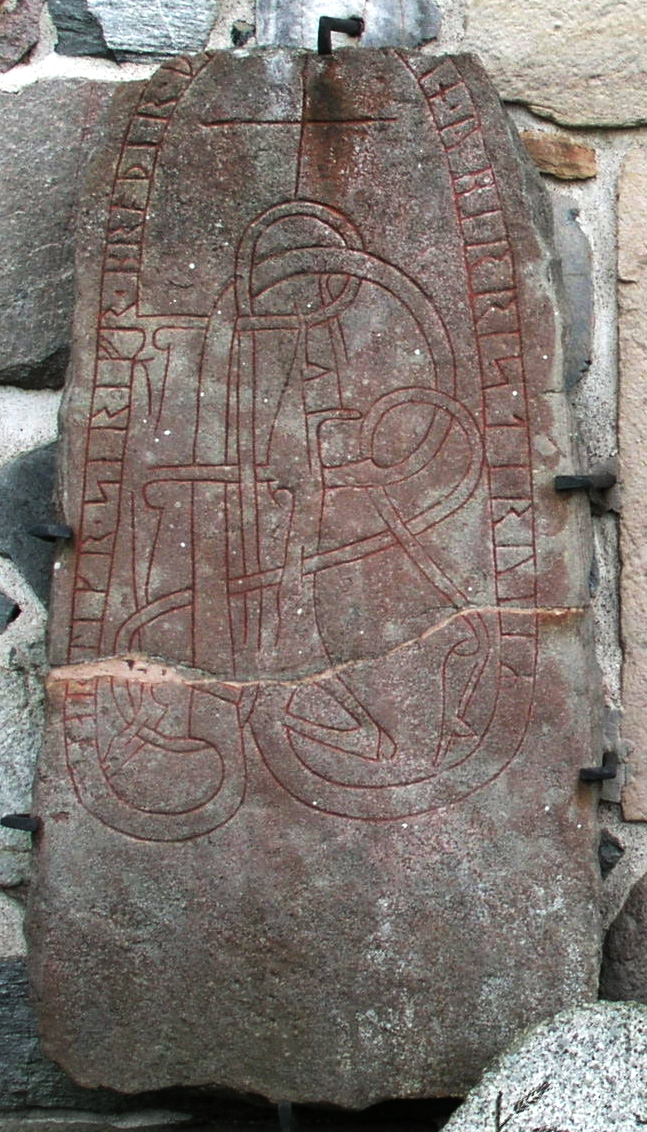
U 541

== KB ==
This style is used by the Rundata project, although it does not attribute it to Gräslund's model. The style is common in western Södermanland and it is characterized by bordered crosses.

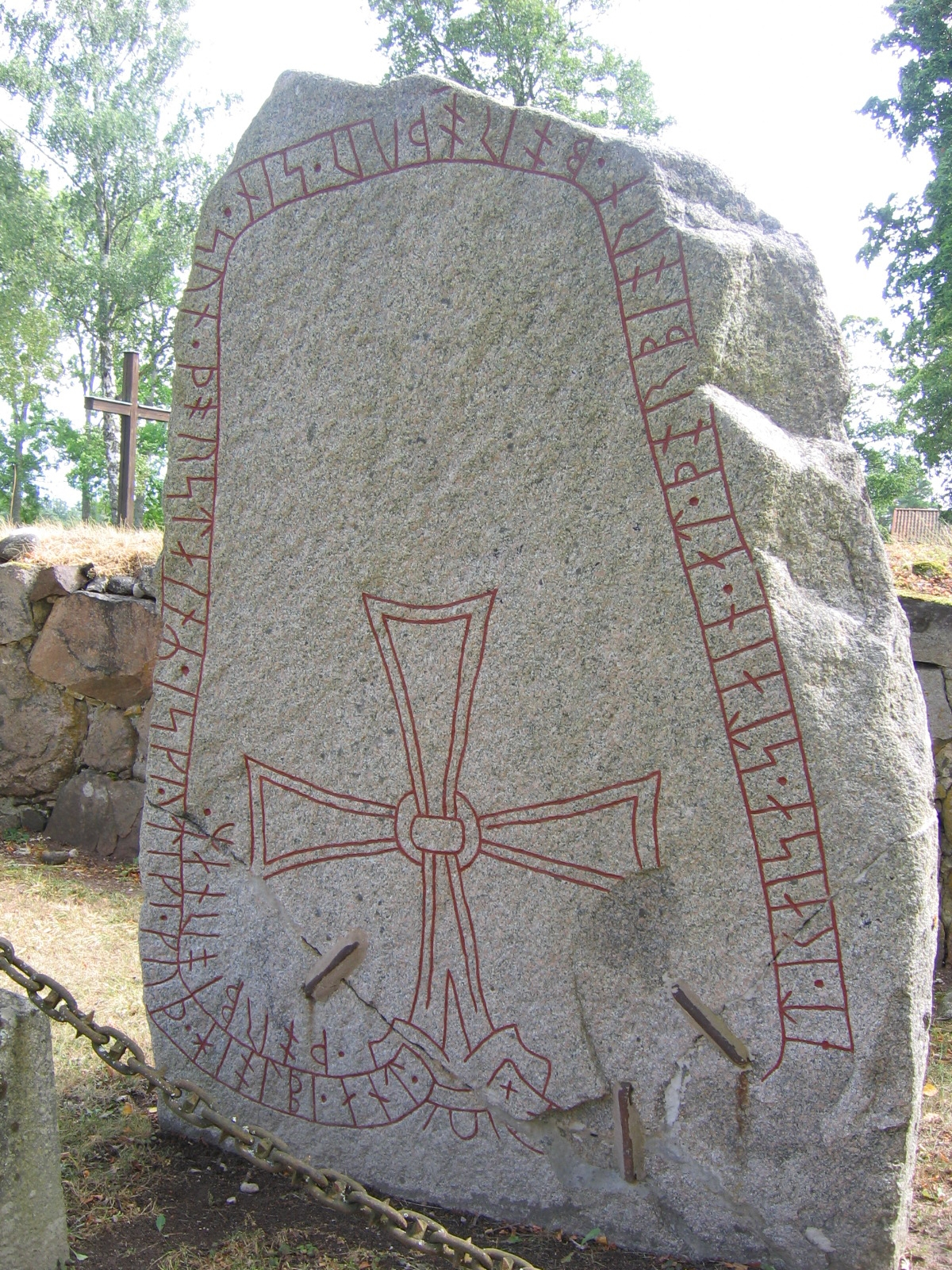
Sö 84

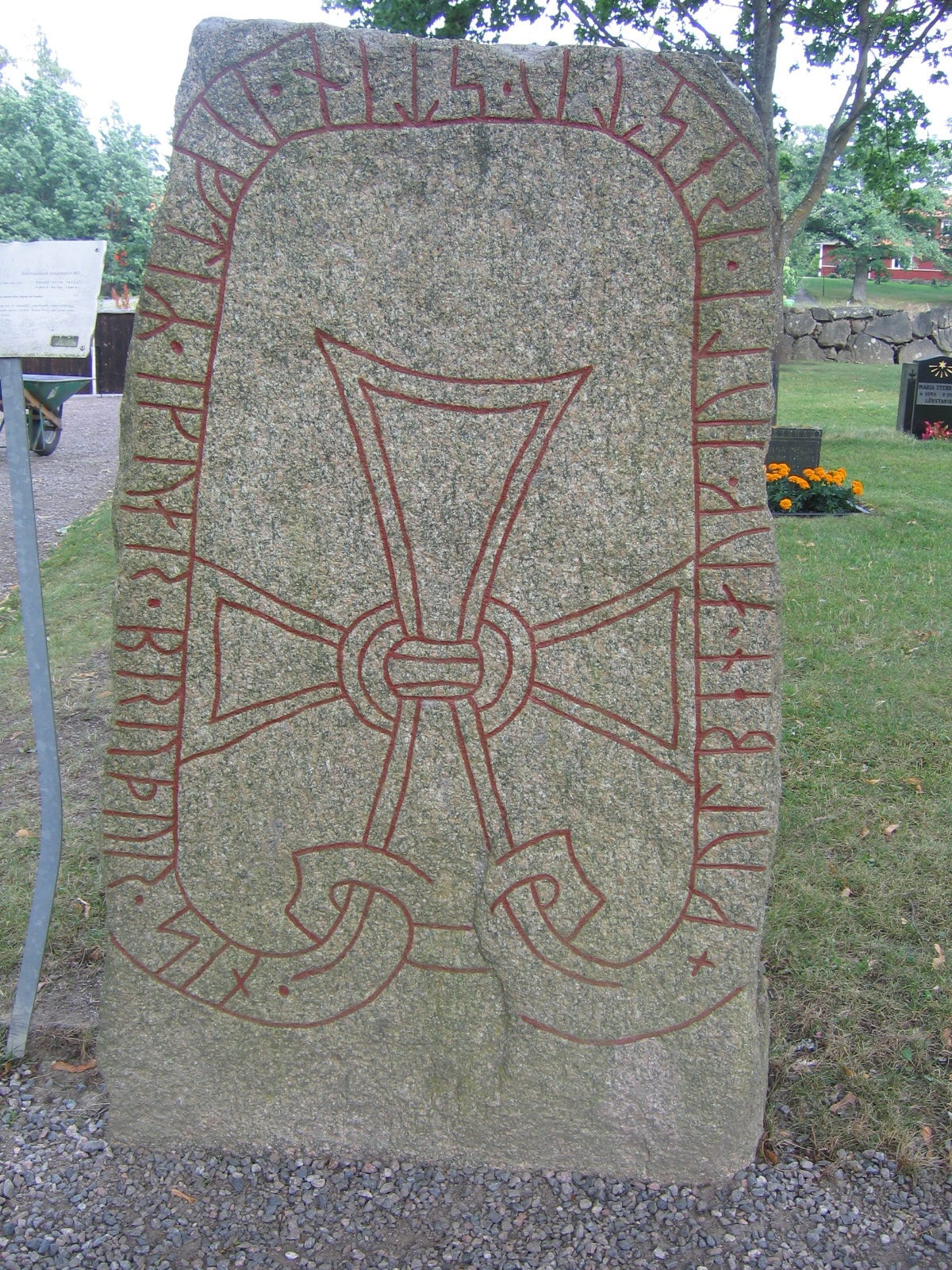
Sö 362

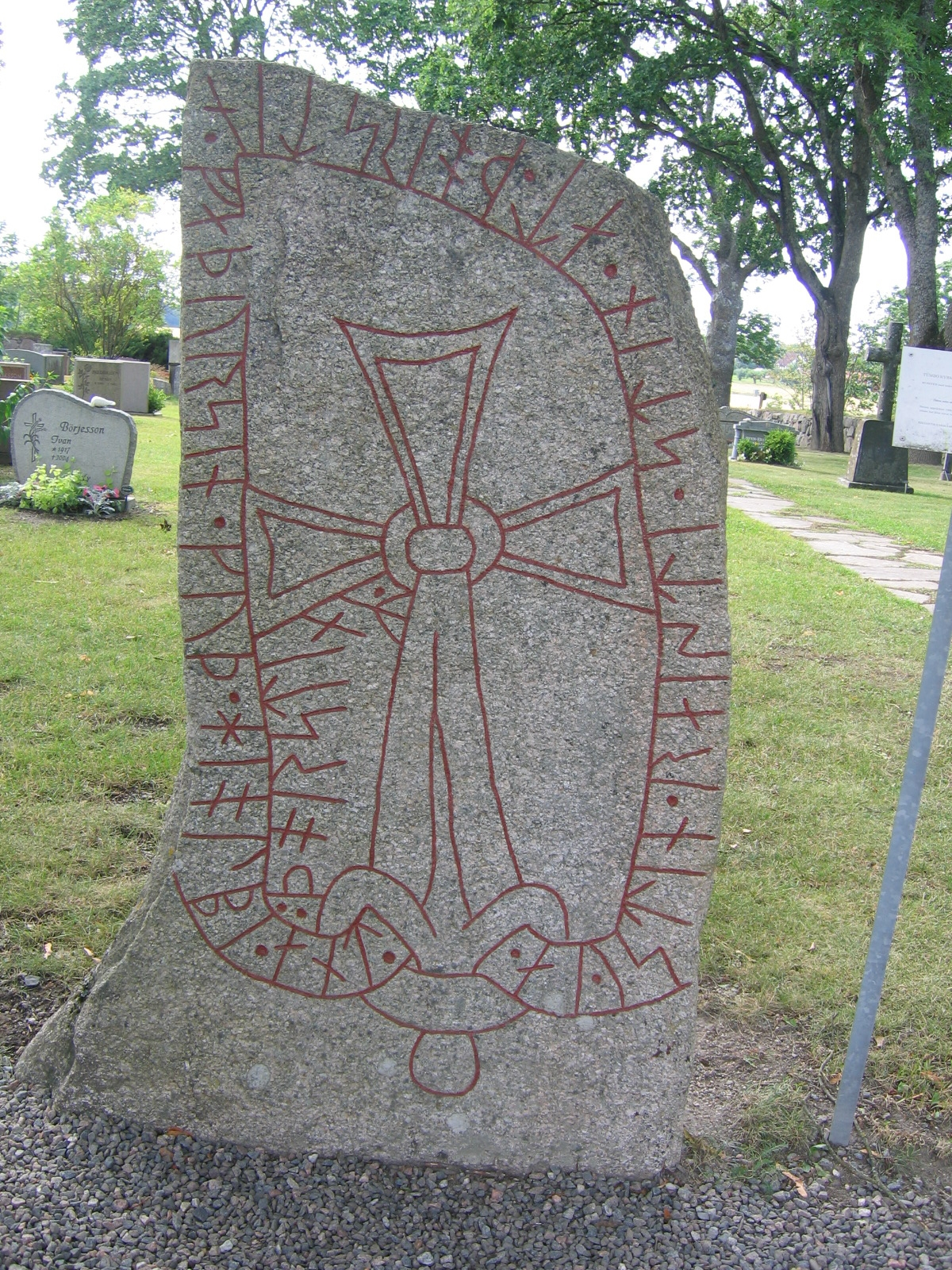
Sö 363

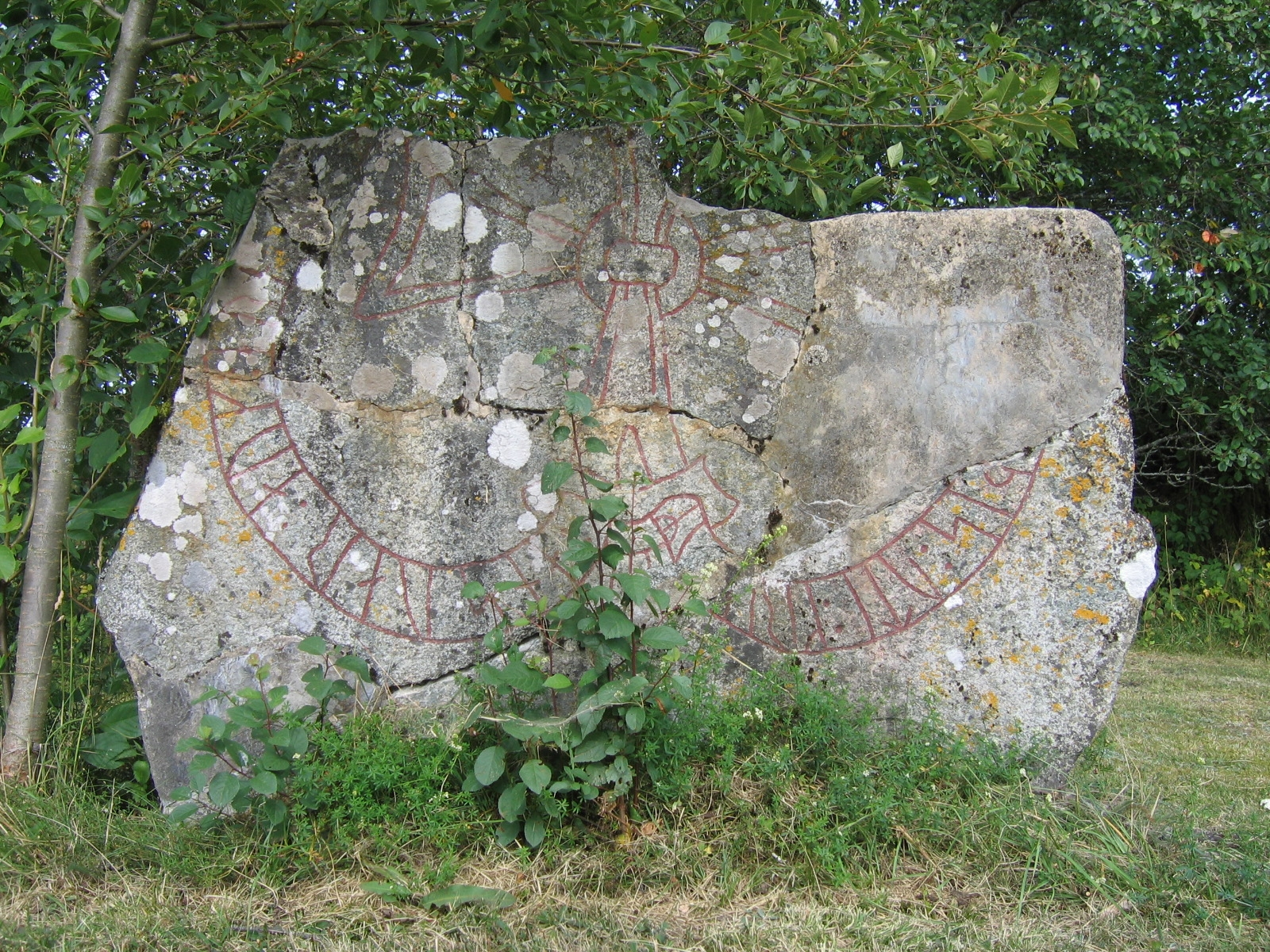
Sö 85

== See also ==
- Anglo-Saxon art
- List of runestones
- Norse art
- Runemaster

== Sources and external links ==
- Rundata
- Edberg, Rune. Runriket Täby-Vallentuna – en Handledning
- Fuglesang, Signe Horn (1998). Swedish Runestones of the Eleventh Century: Ornament and Dating, Runeninschriften als Quellen Interdisziplinärer Forschung (K. Düwel ed.). Göttingen. pp. 197–218
- Sawyer, Peter. (1997). The Oxford Illustrated History of the Vikings. Oxford: Oxford University Press. ISBN 978-0-19-285434-6
