= Viking art =

Term for art of Scandinavia and Viking settlements of 8th-11th centuries

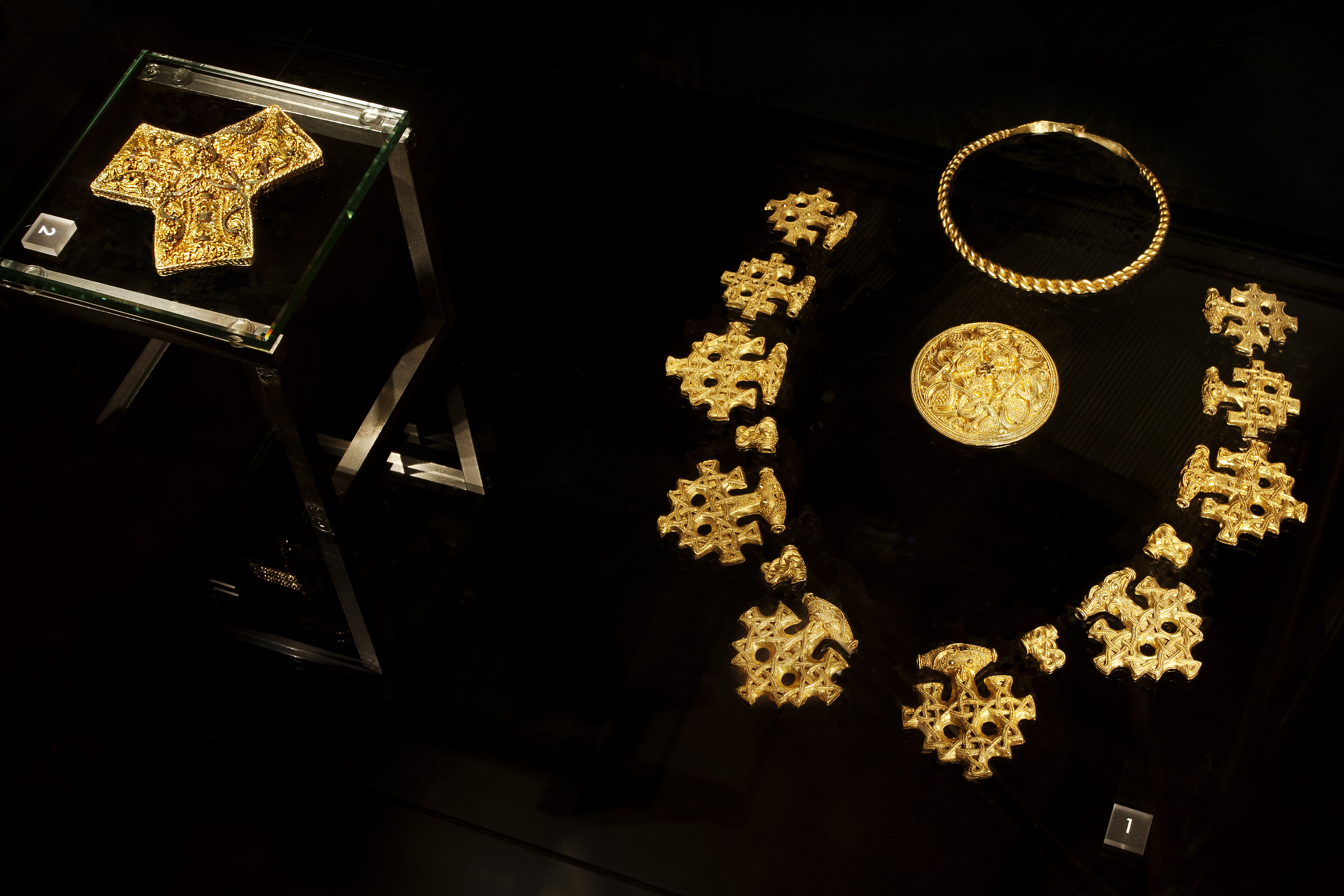
Gold jewellery from the 10th century Hiddensee treasure, mixing Norse pagan and Christian symbols.

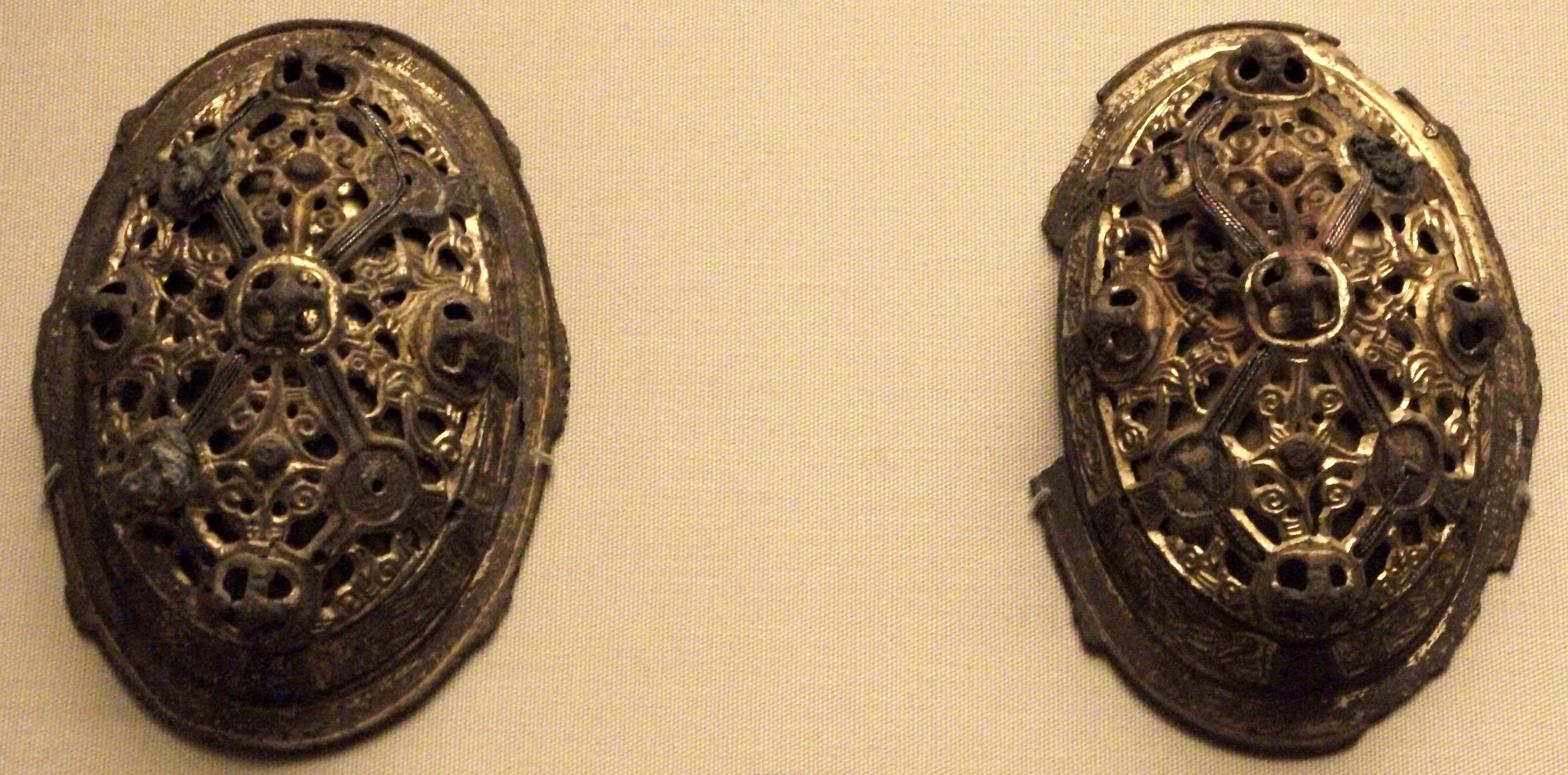
Pair of "tortoise brooches," which were worn by married Viking women

Viking art, also known commonly as Norse art, is a term widely accepted for the art of Scandinavian Norsemen and Viking settlements further afield—particularly in the British Isles and Iceland—during the Viking Age of the 8th-11th centuries. Viking art has many design elements in common with Celtic, Germanic, the later Romanesque and Eastern European art, sharing many influences with each of these traditions.

Generally speaking, the current knowledge of Viking art relies heavily upon more durable objects of metal and stone; wood, bone, ivory and textiles are more rarely preserved. The artistic record, therefore, as it has survived to the present day, remains significantly incomplete. Ongoing archaeological excavation and opportunistic finds, of course, may improve this situation in the future, as indeed they have in the recent past.

Viking art is usually divided into a sequence of roughly chronological styles, although outside Scandinavia itself local influences are often strong, and the development of styles can be less clear.

== Historical context ==
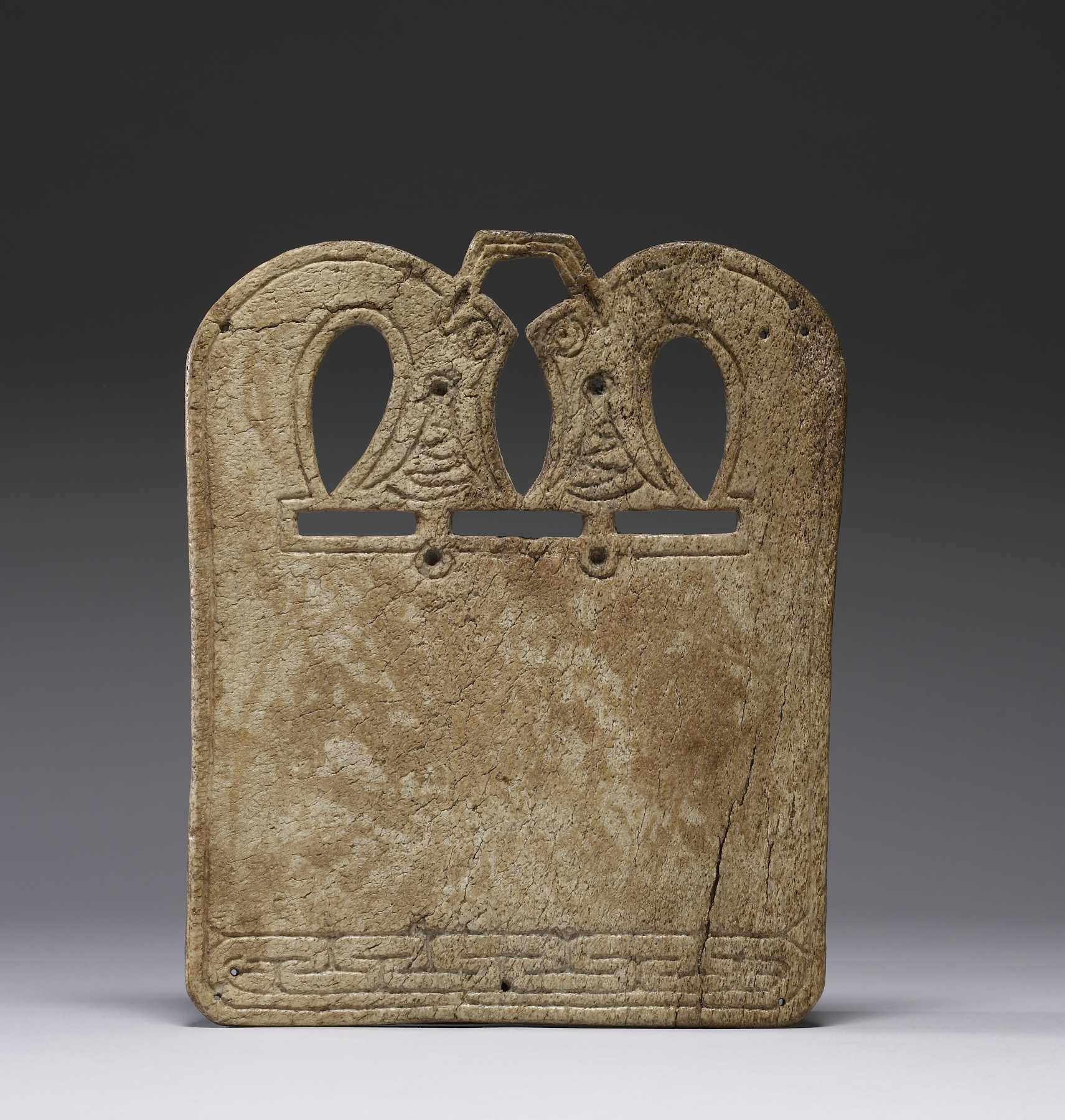
Decorated plaque in whale bone, 8th–late 9th century, 22×18.3×0.8 cm (8.7×7.2×0.3 in)

The Vikings' regional origins lay in Scandinavia, the northernmost peninsula of continental Europe, while the term 'Viking' likely derived from their own term for coastal raiding—the activity by which many neighboring cultures became acquainted with the inhabitants of the region.

Viking raiders attacked wealthy targets on the north-western coasts of Europe from the late 8th until the mid-11th century CE. Pre-Christian traders and sea raiders, the Vikings first enter recorded history with their attack on the Christian monastic community on Lindisfarne Island in 793.

The Vikings initially employed their longships to invade and attack European coasts, harbors and river settlements on a seasonal basis. Subsequently, Viking activities diversified to include trading voyages to the east, west, and south of their Scandinavian homelands, with repeated and regular voyages following river systems east into Russia and the Black and Caspian Sea regions, and west to the coastlines of the British Isles, Iceland and Greenland. Evidence exists for Vikings reaching Newfoundland well before the later voyages of Christopher Columbus came to the New World.

Trading and merchant activities were accompanied by settlement and colonization in many of these territories.

== By material ==
=== Wood and organic materials ===
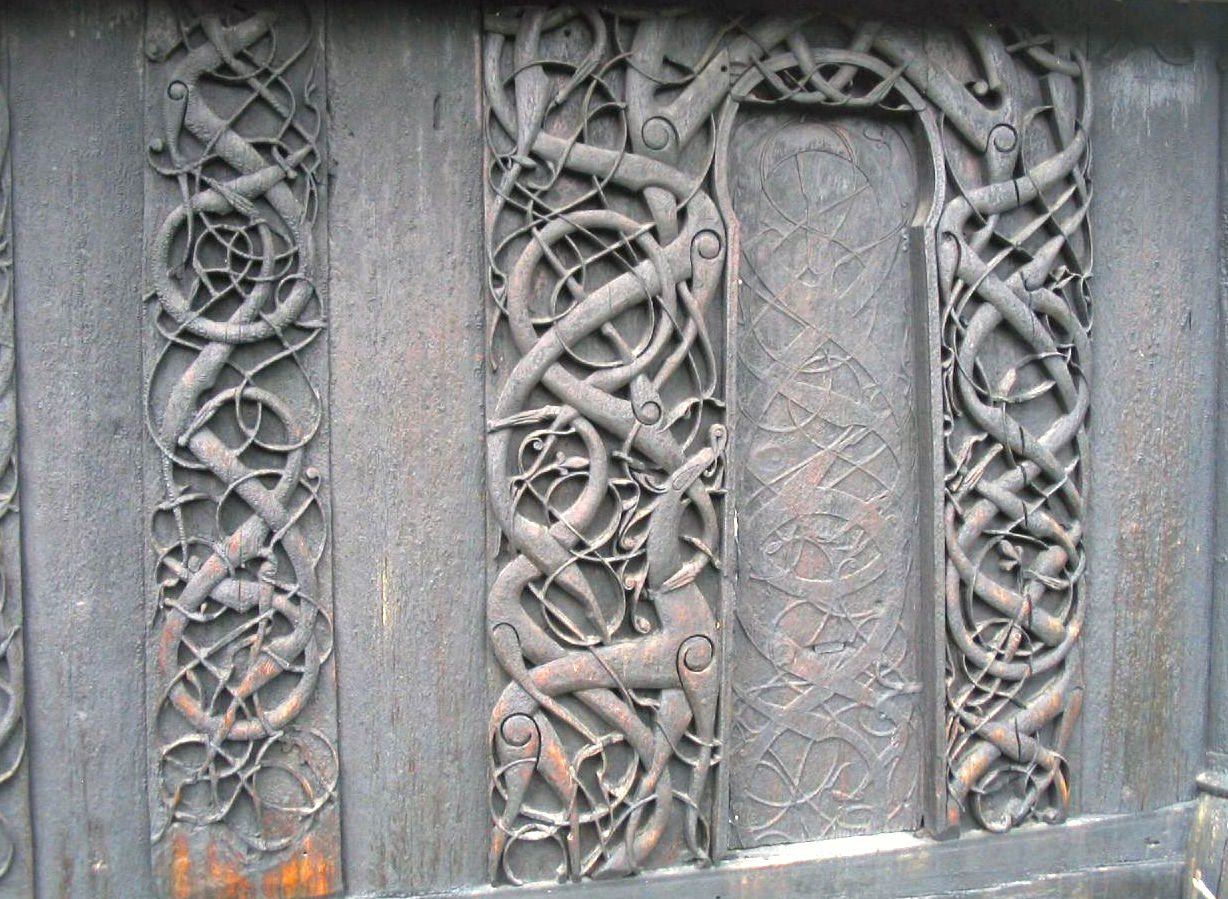
Wood carving at Urnes Stave Church in Norway—a rare survival.

Wood was undoubtedly the primary material of choice for Viking artists, being relatively easy to carve, inexpensive, and abundant in northern Europe. The importance of wood as an artistic medium is underscored by chance survivals of wood artistry at the very beginning and end of the Viking period, namely, the Oseberg ship-burial carvings of the early 9th century and the carved decoration of the Urnes Stave Church from the 12th century. As summarised by James Graham-Campbell: "These remarkable survivals allow us to form at least an impression of what we are missing from original corpus of Viking art, although wooden fragments and small-scale carvings in other materials (such as antler, amber, and walrus ivory) provide further hints. The same is inevitably true of the textile arts, although weaving and embroidery were clearly well-developed crafts." Woodworking was used on all sorts of items like ships, furniture, and ceremonial objects.

=== Stone ===
With the exception of the Gotlandic picture stones prevalent in Sweden early in the Viking period, stone carving was apparently not practiced elsewhere in Scandinavia until the mid-10th century and the creation of the royal monuments at Jelling in Denmark. Subsequently, and likely influenced by the spread of Christianity, the use of carved stone for permanent memorials became more prevalent.

=== Metal ===
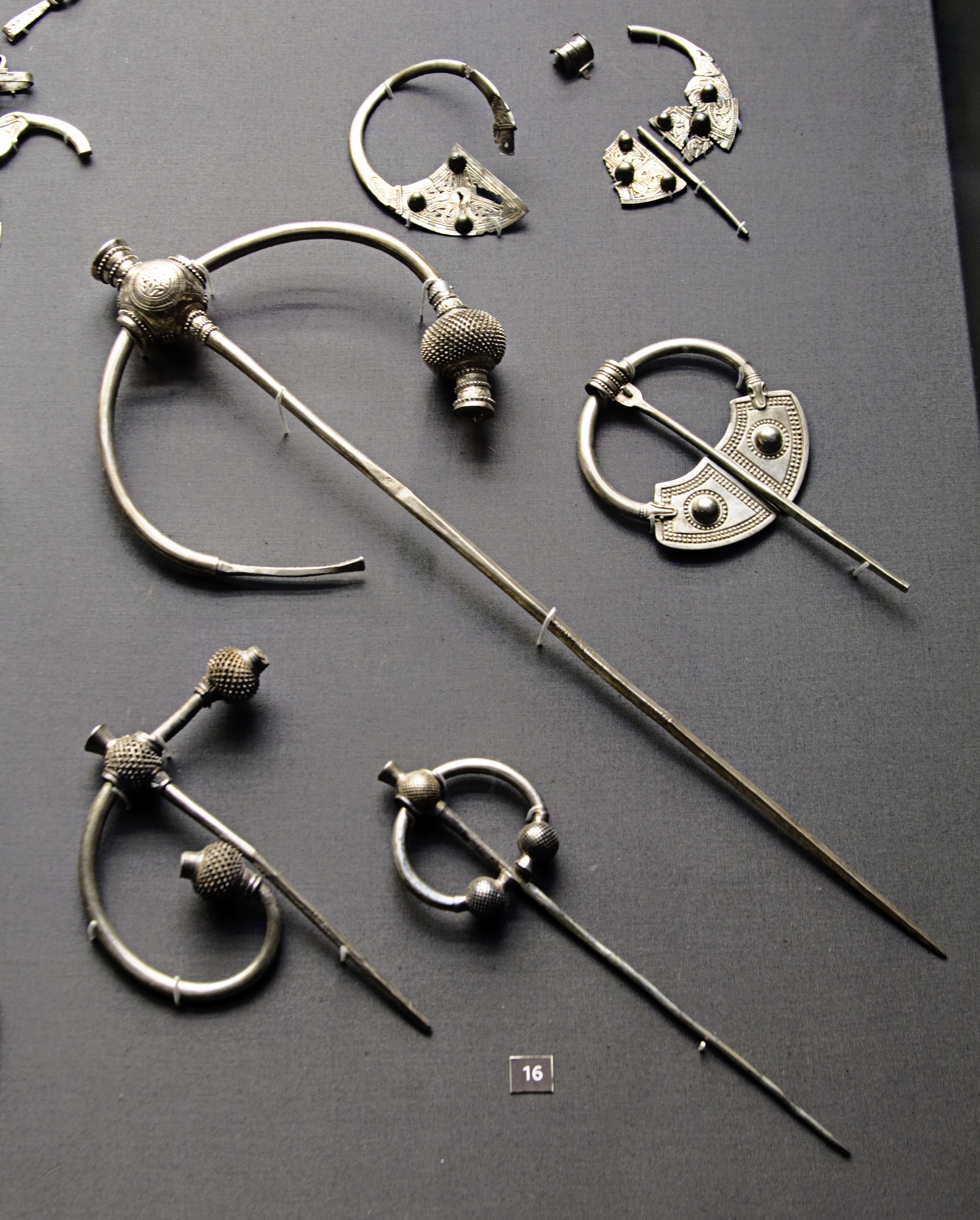
Silver penannular brooches from the Penrith Hoard from Viking north England, early 10th century

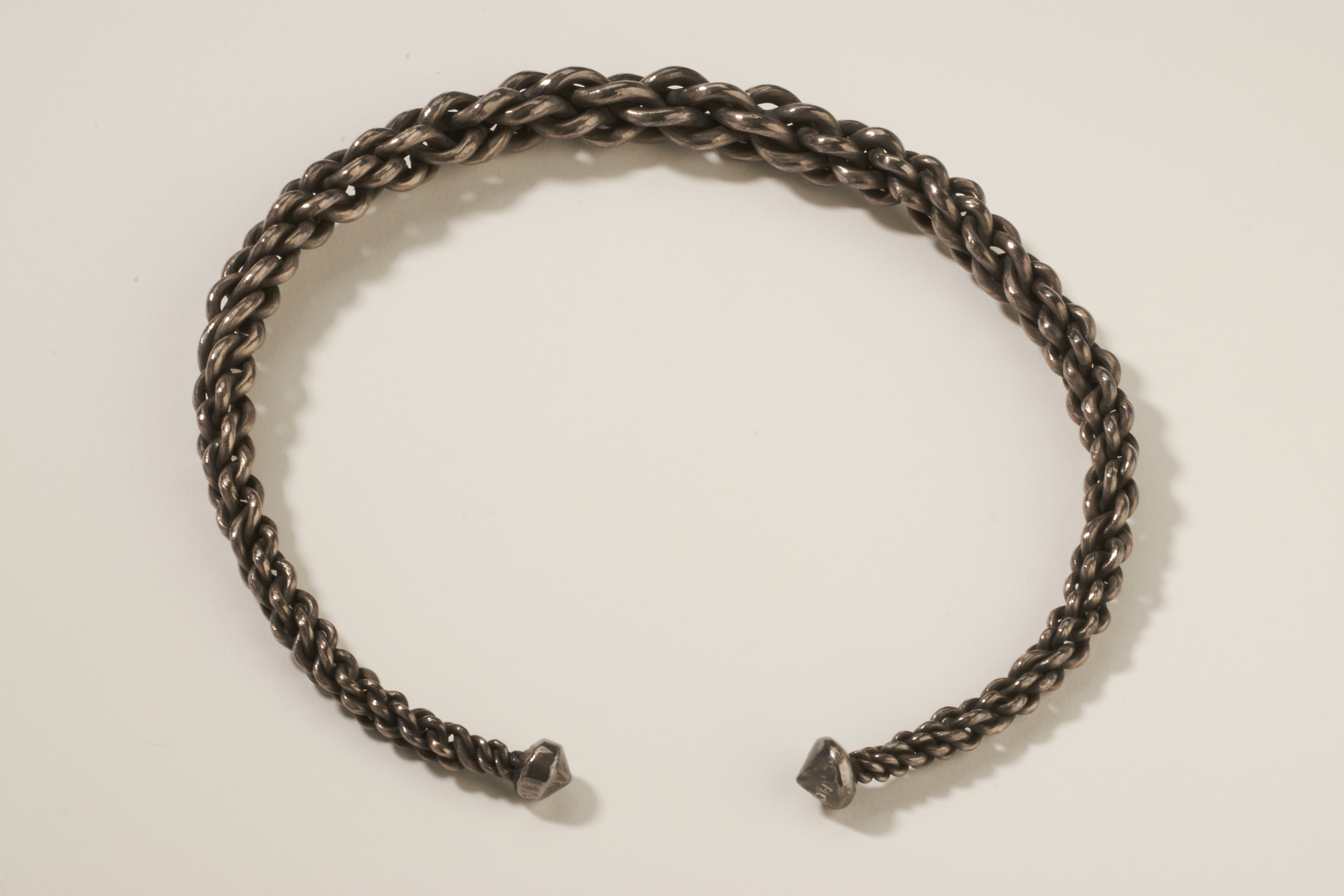
Viking Silver Neck-Ring - two twisted silver ropes in Hunt Museum

Beyond the discontinuous record of artefacts in wood and stone, the reconstructed history of Viking art to date relies most on the study of decoration of ornamental metalwork from a great variety of sources. Several types of archaeological context have succeeded in preserving metal objects for present study, while the durability of precious metals, in particular, has preserved much artistic expression and endeavor.

Jewelry was worn by both men and women, though of different types. Married women fastened their overdresses near the shoulder with matching pairs of large brooches. Modern scholars often call them "tortoise brooches" because of their domed shape. The shapes and styles of women's paired brooches varied regionally, but many used openwork. Women often strung metal chains or strings of beads between the brooches or suspended ornaments from the bottom of the brooches. Men wore rings on their fingers, arms and necks, and held their cloaks closed with penannular brooches, often with extravagantly long pins. Their weapons were often richly decorated on areas such as sword hilts. A small number of large and lavish pieces or sets in solid gold have been found, probably belonging to royalty or major figures.

Decorated metalwork of an everyday nature is frequently recovered from Viking period graves, on account of the widespread practice of making burials accompanied by grave goods. The deceased was dressed in their best clothing and jewelry, and was interred with weapons, tools, and household goods. Items were forged by casting, inlay, and engraving. Less common, but significant nonetheless, are finds of precious metal objects in the form of treasure hoards, many apparently concealed for safe-keeping by owners later unable to recover their contents, although some may have been deposited as offerings to the gods.

Recently, given the increasing popularity and legality of metal-detecting, an increasing frequency of single, chance finds of metal objects and ornaments (most probably representing accidental losses) is creating a fast expanding corpus of new material for study.

Viking coins fit well into this latter category, but nonetheless form a separate category of Viking period artefact, their design and decoration largely independent of the developing styles characteristic of wider Viking artistic endeavour.

The original colours of most Viking artefacts have faded or vanished over the years, which is why they look so plain now. Pigment traces found on wood and ships provide evidence that the Vikings frequently used a mixture of natural pigments and oils or fats to paint their carvings and surfaces. This suggests that a lot of the carved designs, shields, wooden beams, and ships from that era were likely considerably more vibrant and eye-catching than they appear today. In addition to their decorative value, the colours may have served ceremonial or symbolic functions. Colour was significantly more important in Viking art than is commonly believed, although very little paint has survived the ground's rapid deterioration.

As with most cultures of the period, our understanding of Viking art is limited because so much of it was created on materials that do not survive well. Many everyday objects were made from wood, bone, leather, and textile, which naturally decay unless kept in perfect conditions. As a result, most surviving Viking artefacts are in metal or stone, which last much longer. This creates a preservation bias that hides a lot of the art that once existed. Wooden furniture, decorated household items, painted interiors, and embroidered textiles would have been common, but most of these have disappeared. Because of this, the surviving objects only give us a partial view, and much of the original creativity of Viking art remains unknown.

== Forms of art ==
=== Beads ===
Beads were a significant part of Viking society for a multitude of reasons. They were a form of art commonly made out of glass but also from different types of metals and, more rarely, natural materials such as amber, carnelian, rock crystal, etc. These were used to create pendants and/or beads for Vikings. Typically, beads were globular and monochrome; however, the rarer beads were kaleidoscopic and had unique patterns.

Beads from the Viking age have been found primarily within Viking burial sites like Birka and also in known Viking settlement locations and trading towns like Hedeby. Beads during this era were costly items, so if used for individual purposes, they were an indicator of wealth and high social status; The role of beads in burial sites indicated their cultural significance and value within the Viking Society.

Beads were also a huge drive for trade; The Norse used them as portable wealth and leverage for economic determinism. While Scandivania’s beads were an attraction and gave wealth to early Viking establishments, over time and through widespread trade routes from Viking expansion, Eastern beads became more popular. However, beads were still used as a form of currency and a symbol of wealth. Beads were an incentive for trade further establishing Viking settlement and were a huge part of Viking art and culture.

=== Textiles ===
While often less preserved reveal a sophisticated tradition of weaving and embroidery, with silk and wool often adorned with elaborate patterns.

=== Other sources ===
A non-visual source of information for Viking art lies in skaldic verse, the complex form of oral poetry composed during the Viking Age and passed on until written down centuries later. Several verses speak of painted forms of decoration that have but rarely survived on wood and stone. The 9th-century skald poet Bragi Boddason, for example, cites four apparently unrelated scenes painted on a shield. One of these scenes depicted the god Thor's fishing expedition, which motif is also referenced in a 10th-century poem by Úlfr Uggason describing the paintings in a newly constructed hall in Iceland.

== Origins and background ==
A continuous artistic tradition common to most of north-western Europe and developing from the 4th century CE formed the foundations on which Viking Age art and decoration were built: from that period onwards, the output of Scandinavian artists was broadly focused on varieties of convoluted animal ornamentation used to decorate a wide variety of objects.

The art historian Bernhard Salin was the first to systematise Germanic animal ornament, dividing it into three styles (I, II, and III). The latter two were subsequently subdivided by Arwidsson into three further styles: Style C, flourishing during the 7th century and into the 8th century, before being largely replaced (especially in southern Scandinavia) by Style D. Styles C and D provided the inspiration for the initial expression of animal ornament within the Viking Age, Style E, commonly known as the Oseberg / Broa Style. Both Styles D and E developed within a broad Scandinavian context which, although in keeping with north-western European animal ornamentation generally, exhibited little influence from beyond Scandinavia .

== Scholarship ==
Although preliminary formulations were made in the late 19th century, the history of Viking art first achieved maturity in the early 20th century with the detailed publication of the ornate wood carvings discovered in 1904 as part of the Oserberg ship-burial by the Norwegian archaeologist Haakon Shetelig.

Importantly, it was the English archaeologist David M. Wilson, working with his Danish colleague Ole Klindt-Jensen to produce the 1966 survey work Viking Art, who created foundations for the systematic characterization of the field still employed today, together with a developed chronological framework.

David Wilson continued to produce mostly English-language studies on Viking art in subsequent years, joined over recent decades by the Norwegian art-historian Signe Horn Fuglesang with her own series of important publications. Together these scholars have combined authority with accessibility to promote the increasing understanding of Viking art as a cultural expression.

== Styles ==
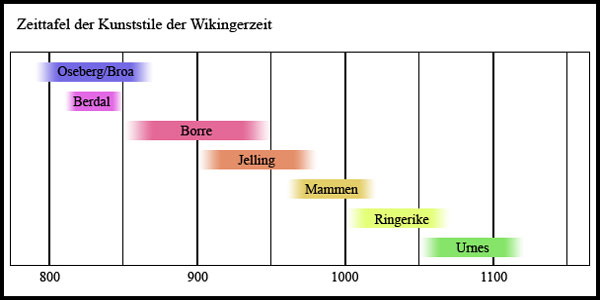
Timeline for the Norse animal styles.

The art of the Viking Age is organized into a loose sequence of stylistic phases which, despite the significant overlap in style and chronology, may be defined and distinguished on account both of formal design elements and of recurring compositions and motifs:

- Oseberg Style
- Borre Style
- Jellinge Style
- Mammen Style
- Ringerike Style
- Urnes Style

Unsurprisingly, these stylistic phases appear in their purest form in Scandinavia itself; elsewhere in the Viking world, notable admixtures from external cultures and influences frequently appear. In the British Isles, for example, art historians identify distinct, 'Insular' versions of Scandinavian motifs, often directly alongside 'pure' Viking decoration.

=== Oseberg Style ===
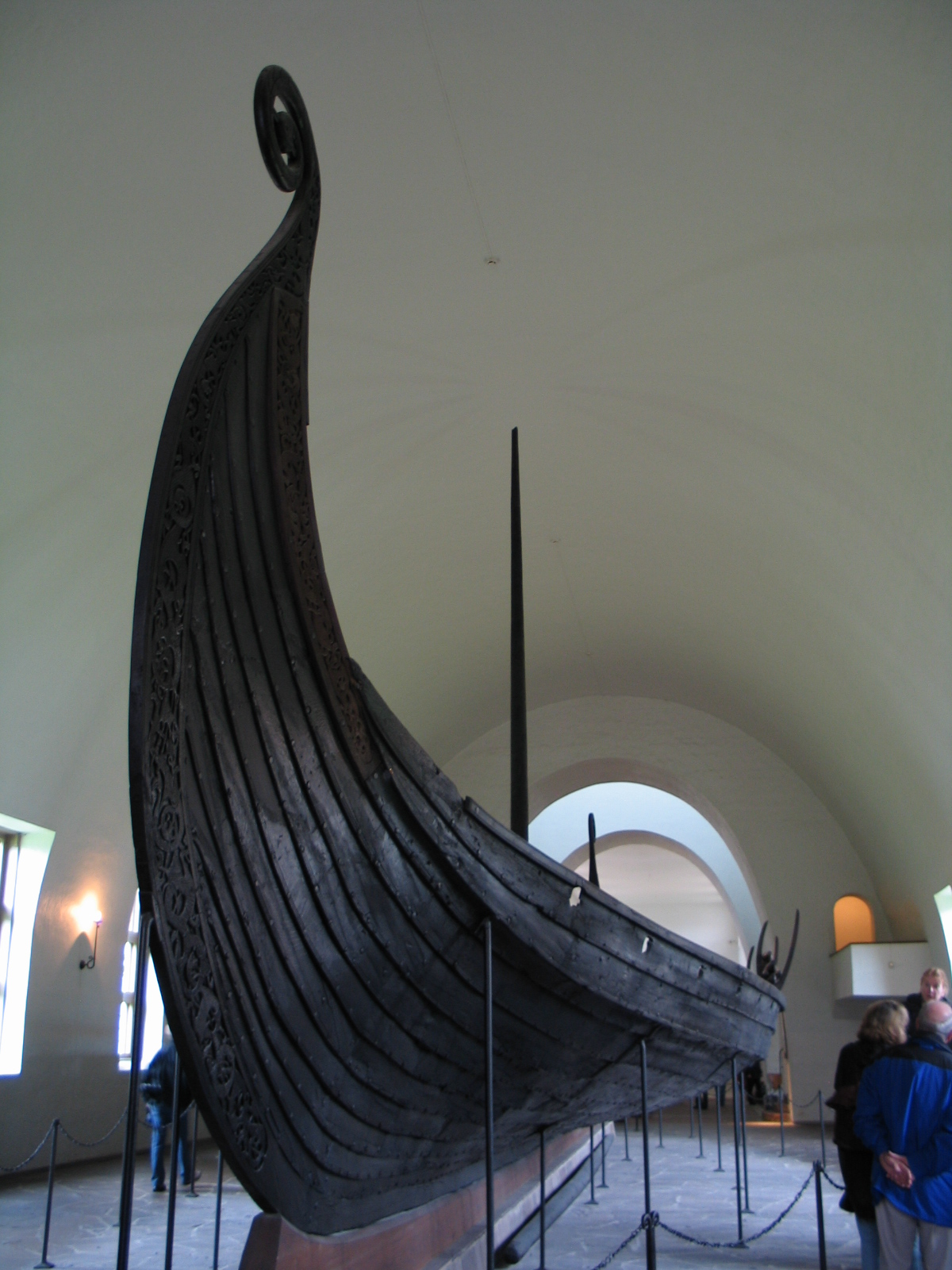
The Oseberg Viking Ship at the Viking Ship Museum, Oslo.

The Oseberg Style characterises the initial phase in what has been considered Viking art. The Oseberg Style takes its name from the Oseberg Ship grave, a well-preserved and highly decorated longship discovered in a large burial mound at the Oseberg farm near Tønsberg in Vestfold, Norway, which also contained a number of other richly decorated wooden objects.

Currently located at the Viking Ship Museum, Bygdøy, and over 70 feet long, the Oseberg Ship held the remains of two women and many precious objects that were probably removed by robbers early before it was found. The Oseberg ship itself is decorated with a more traditional style of animal interlace that does not feature the gripping beast motif. However, five carved wooden animal-head posts were found in the ship, and the one known as the Carolingian animal-head post is decorated with gripping beasts, as are other grave goods from the ship. The Carolingian head represents a snarling beast, possibly a wolf, with surface ornamentation in the form of interwoven animals that twist and turn as they are gripping and snapping.

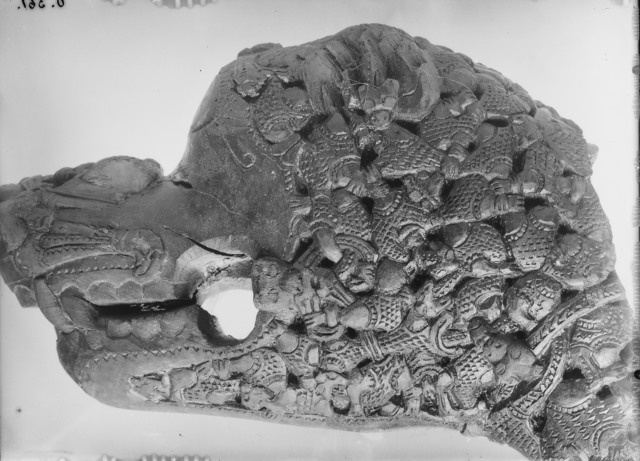
Detail of the Carolingian animal-head post from the Oseberg ship burial, showing the gripping beast motif.

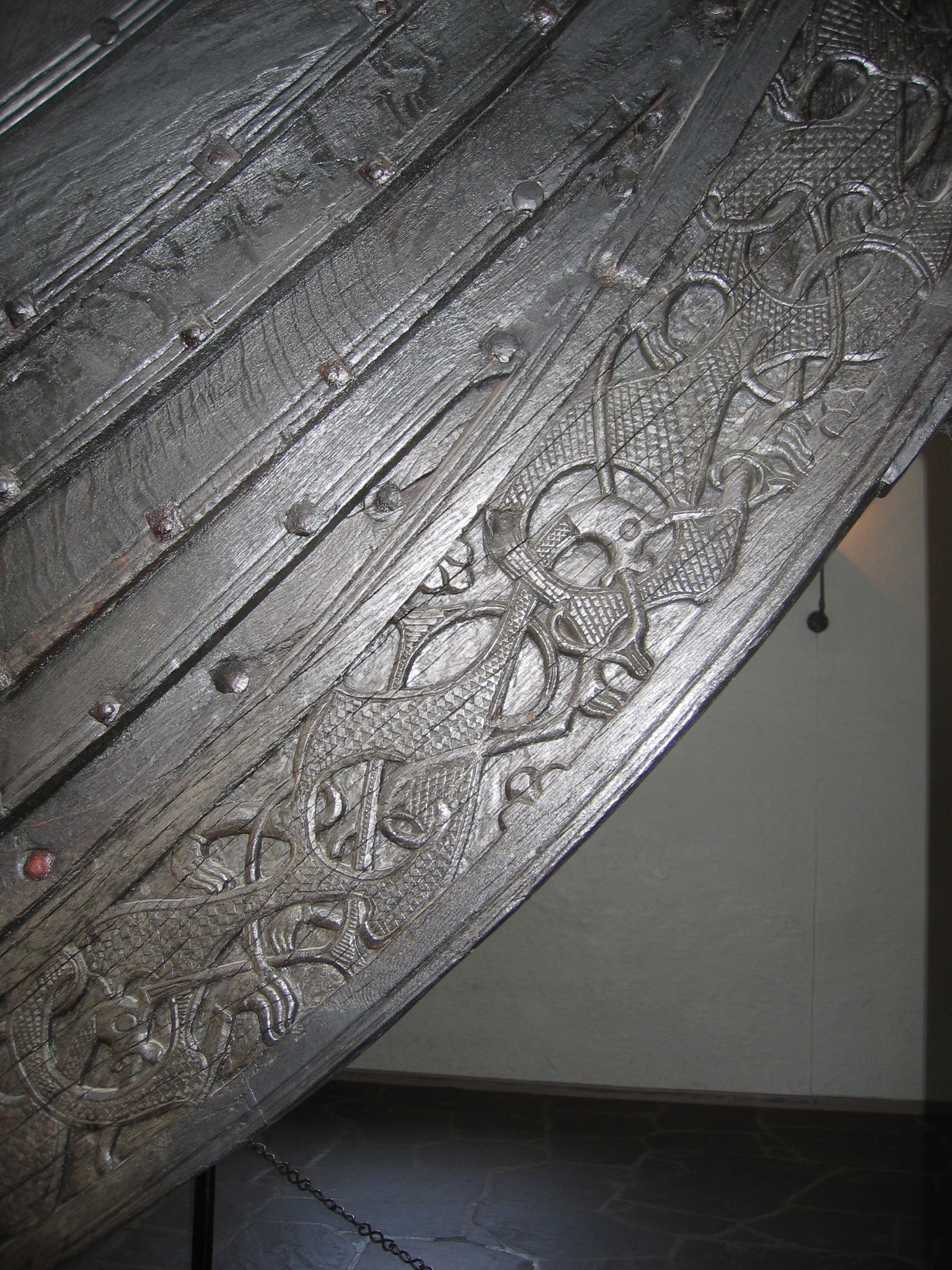
Detail from the Oseberg ship

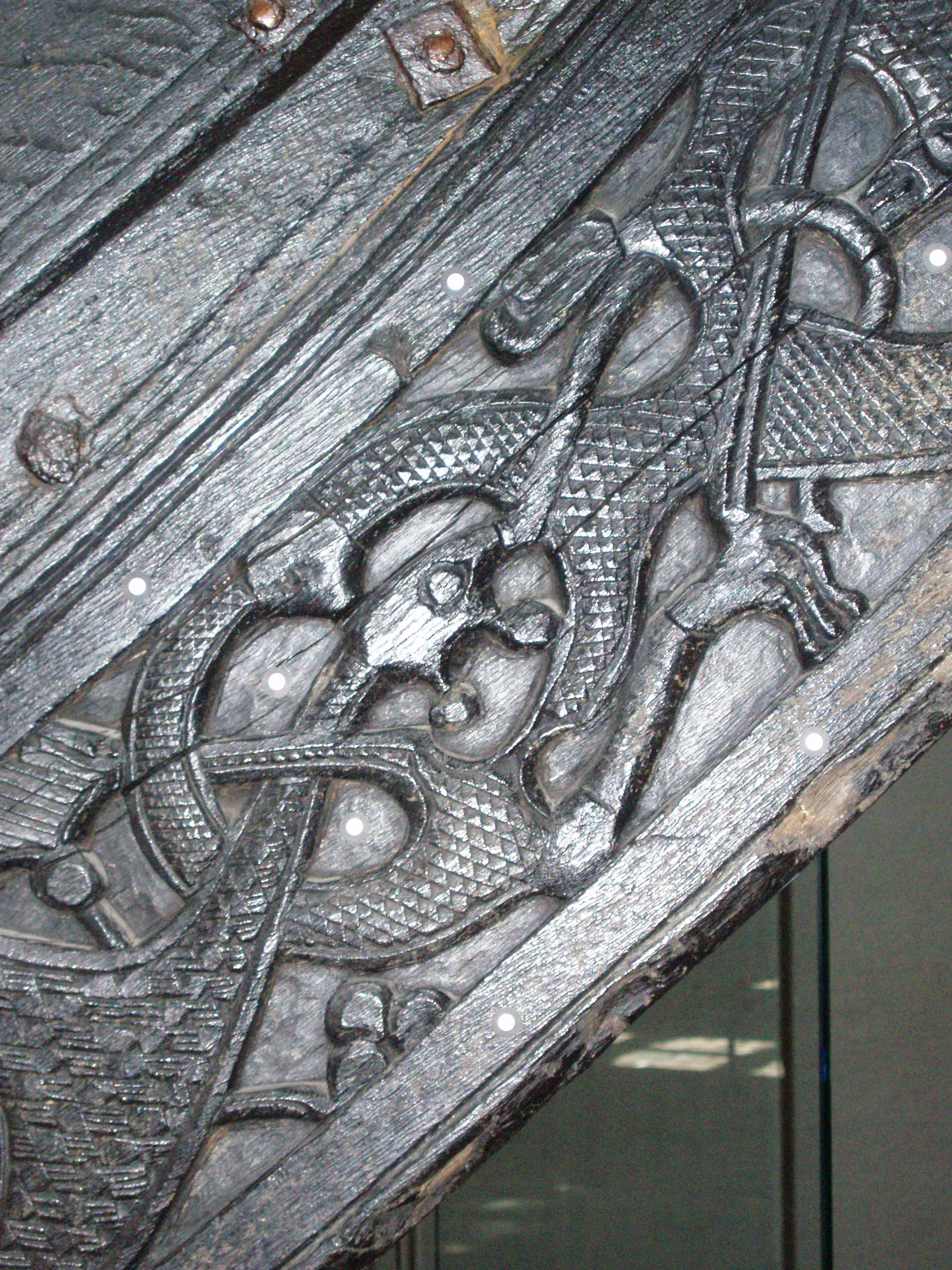
Oseberg bow detail

==== Broa style ====
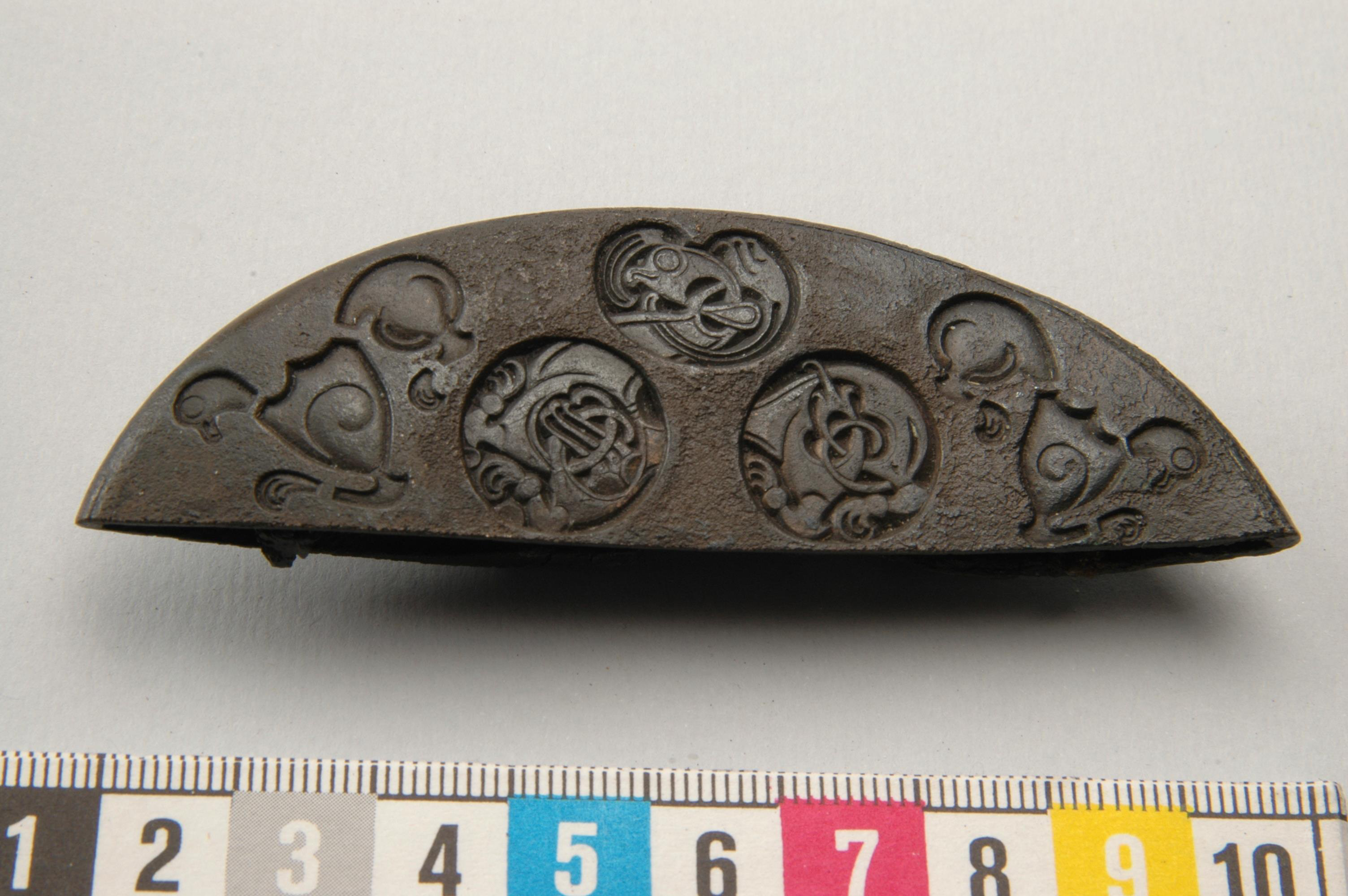
Fragment of a sword pommel decorated in Broa style, from grave 174 at Stora och Lilla Ihre, Hellvi parish, Gotland. Bronze. 550 – 800, Vendel age.

The Broa style, named after a bridle-mount found at Broa, Halla parish, Gotland, is sometimes included with the Oseberg style, and sometimes held as its own.

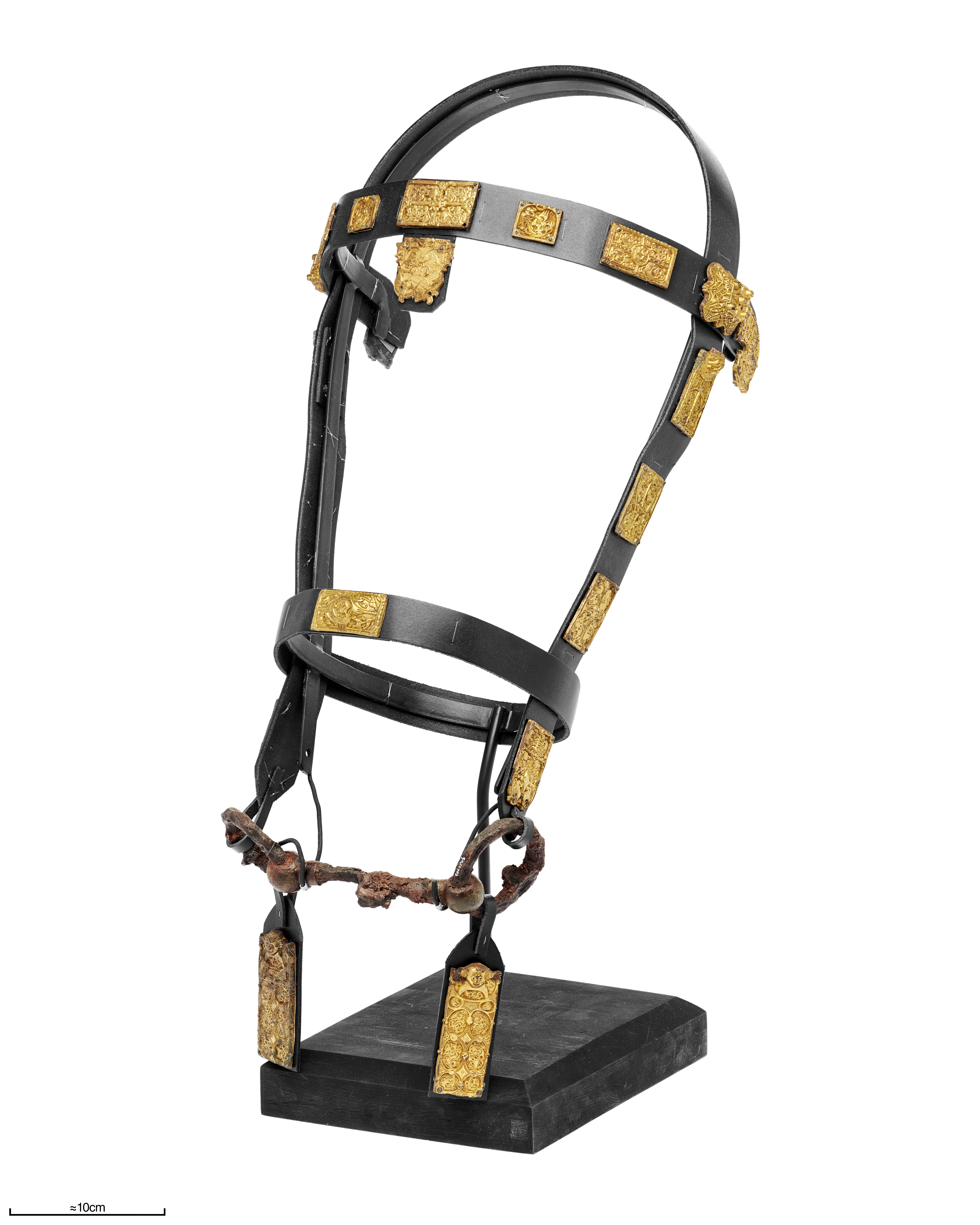
Photograph of the Broa bridle taken by Ola Myrin for the Swedish Historiska museet exhibit "The Viking World".

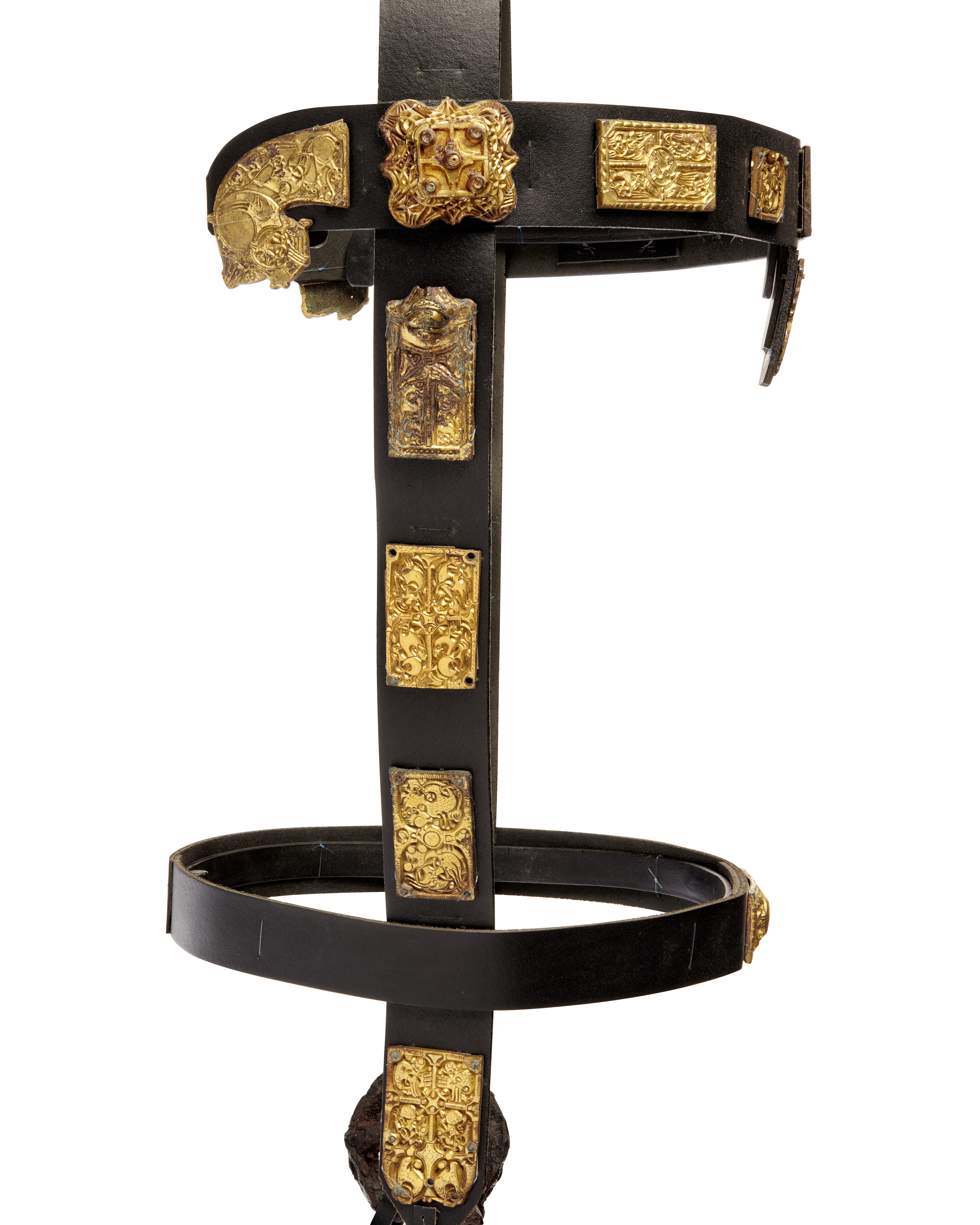
Right side relative to the horse.

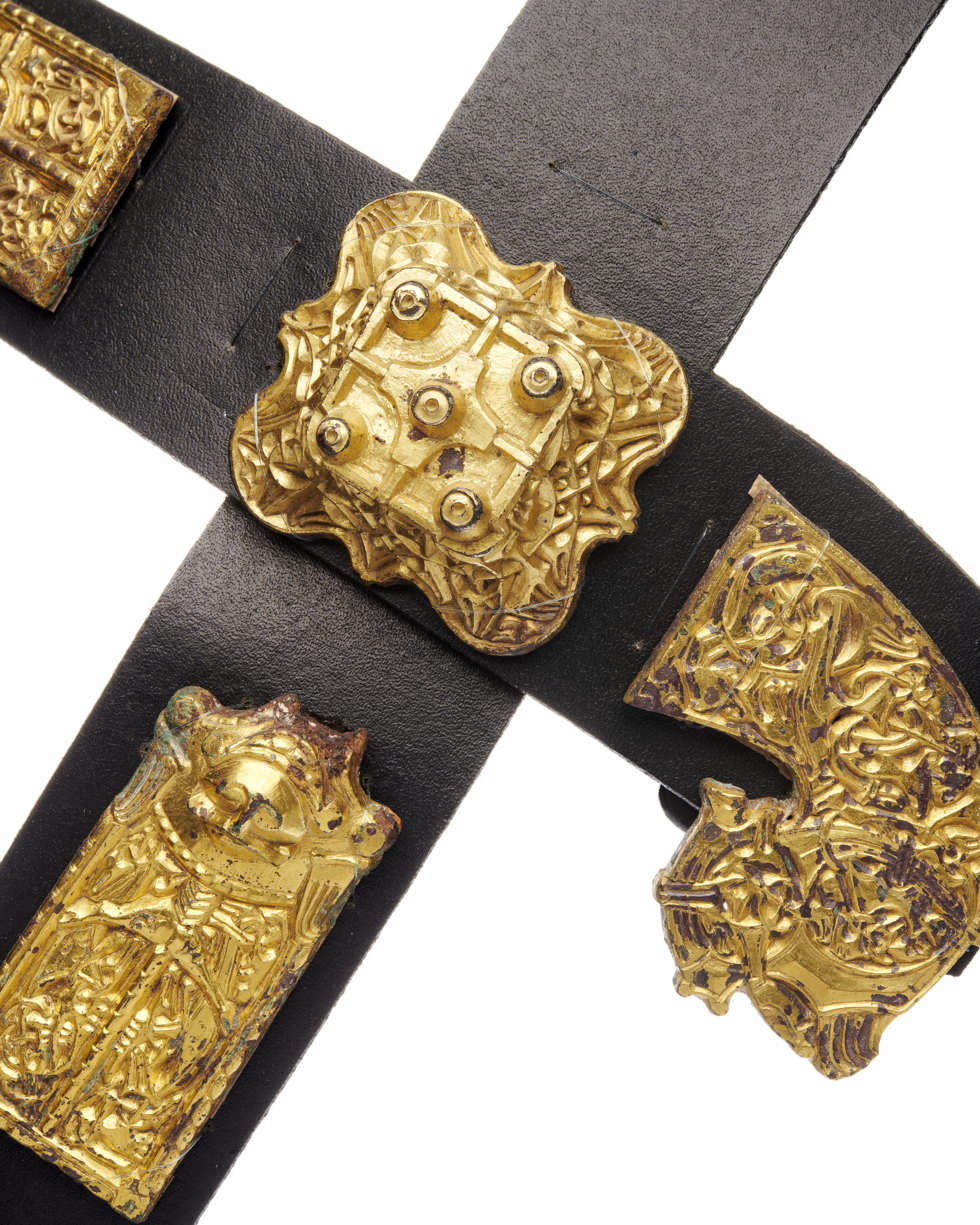
Detail of left side.

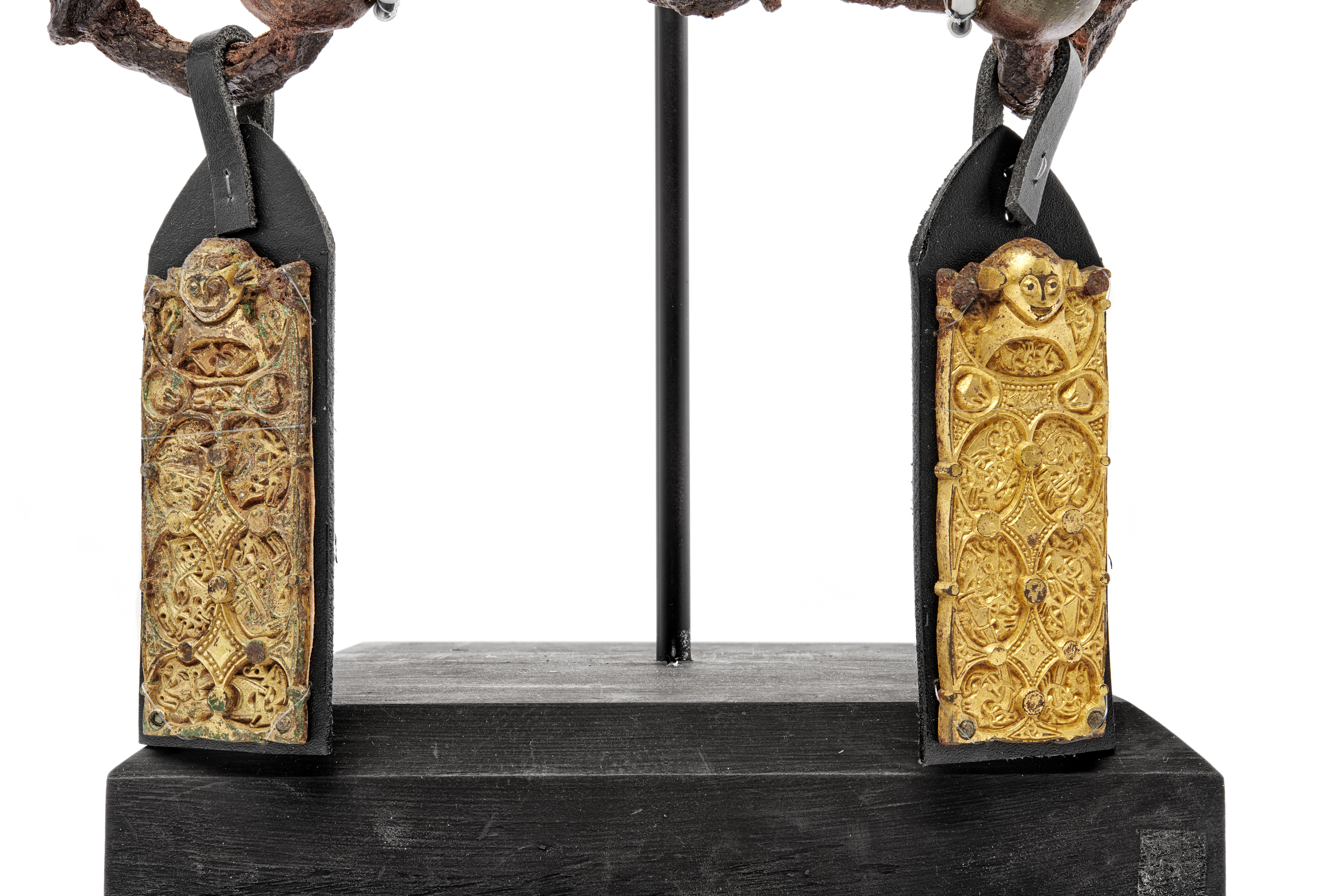
Detail of mounts hanging from the bit.

=== Borre Style ===
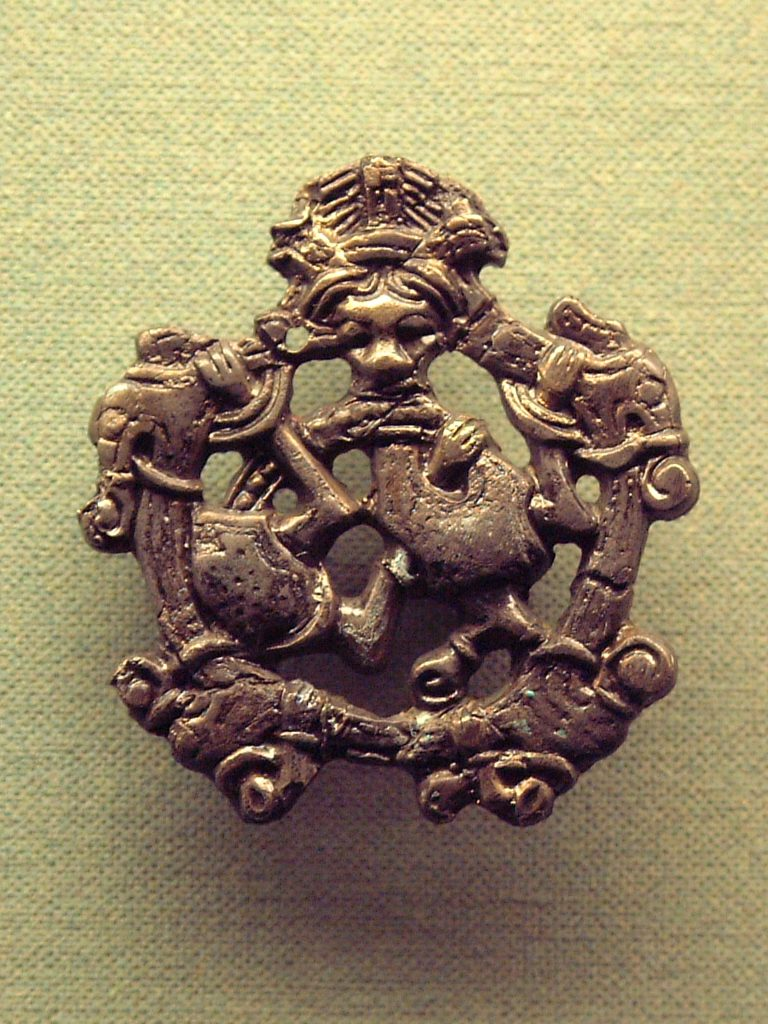
Bronze pendant from Hedeby (Haithabu)

The Borre Style embraces a range of geometric interlace / knot patterns and zoomorphic (single animal) motifs, first recognised in a group of gilt-bronze harness mounts recovered from a ship grave in Borre mound cemetery near the village of Borre, Vestfold, Norway, and from which the name of the style derives. The Borre Style prevailed in Scandinavia from the late 9th through to the late 10th century, a timeframe supported by dendrochronological data supplied from sites with characteristically Borre Style artefacts, notably found in brooches.

The 'gripping-beast' with a ribbon-shaped body continues as a characteristic of this and earlier styles. As with geometric patterning in this phase, the visual thrust of the Borre Style results from the filling of available space: ribbon animal plaits are tightly interlaced and animal bodies are arranged to create tight, closed compositions. As a result, any background is markedly absent – a characteristic of the Borre Style that contrasts strongly with the more open and fluid compositions that prevailed in the overlapping Jellinge Style.

A more particular diagnostic feature of Borre Style lies in a symmetrical, double-contoured 'ring-chain' (or 'ring-braid'), whose composition consists of interlaced circles separated by transverse bars and a lozenge overlay. The Borre ring-chain occasionally terminates with an animal head in high relief, as seen on strap fittings from Borre and Gokstad.

The ridges of designs in metalwork are often nicked to imitate the filigree wire employed in the finest pieces of craftsmanship.

=== Jellinge Style ===
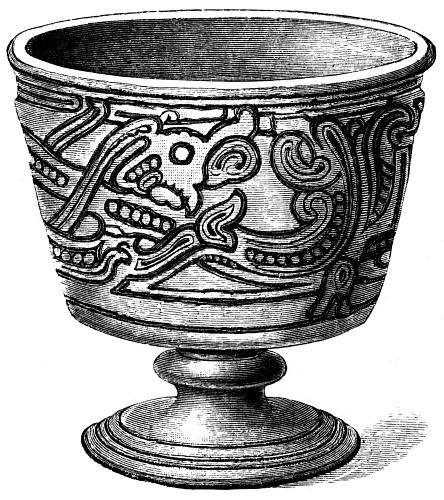
Gorm's Cup, from the barrow of Gorm the Old at Jelling.

The Jellinge Style is a phase of Scandinavian animal art that took place during the late 10th century. Bridging the earlier Borre style with the later Mammen style, it is characterized by ribbon-like stylized animal motifs and band-shaped bodies of animals. It was originally applied to a variety of objects in Jelling, Denmark, such as Gorm's Cup (by King Gorm,) and Harald Bluetooth's great runestone, but more recently the style is included in the Mammen style.

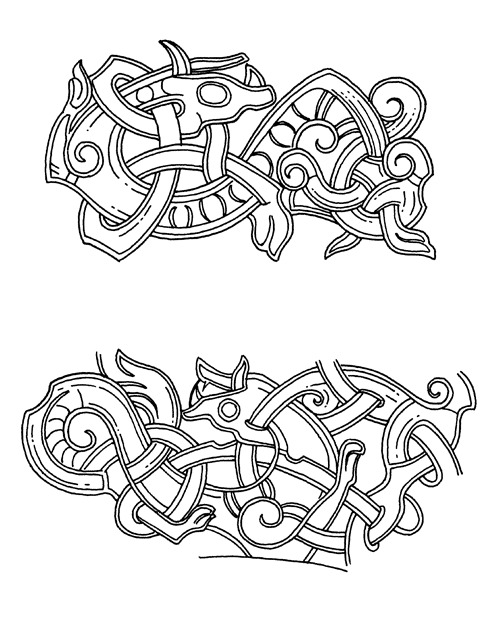

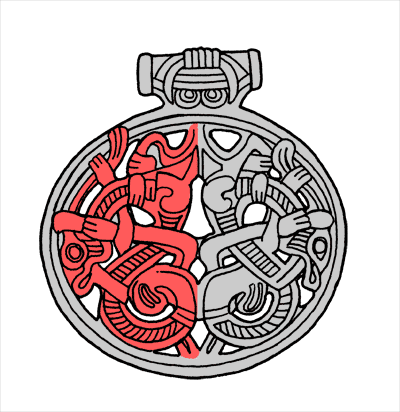

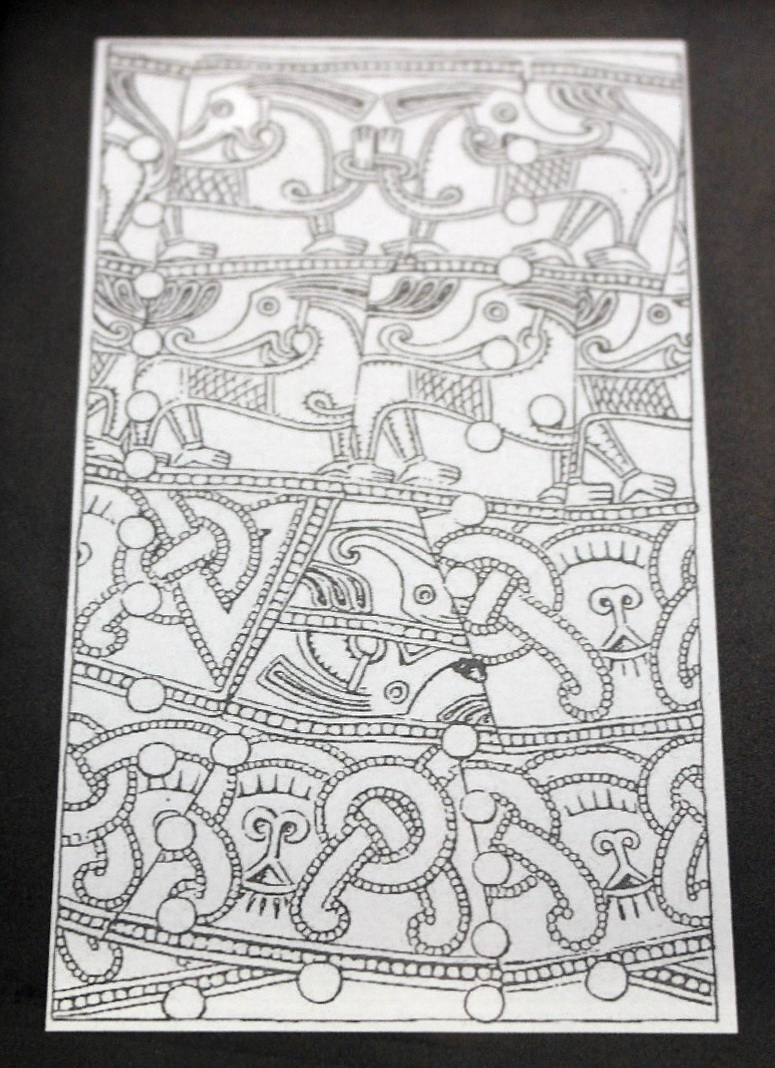

=== Mammen Style ===
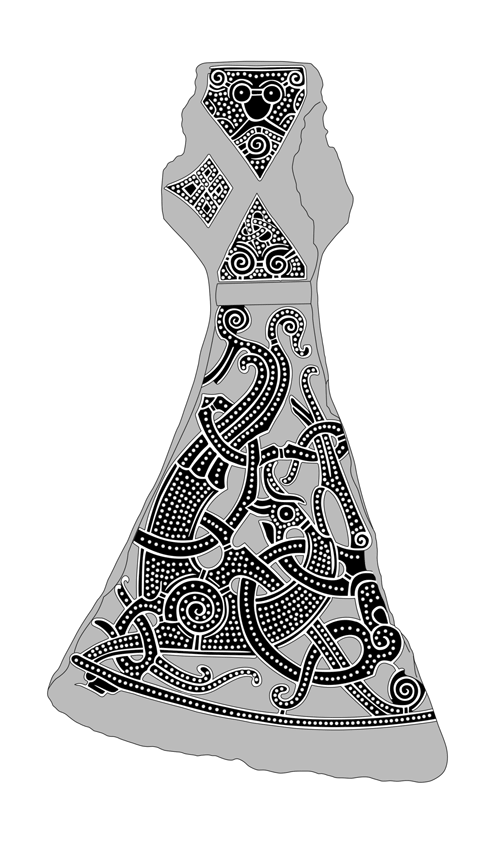
The axe head from Mammen. Iron with silver engraving.

The Mammen Style takes its name from its type object, an axe recovered from a wealthy man's burial mound (Bjerringhø) at Mammen, in Jutland, Denmark (on the basis of dendrochronology, the wood used in construction of the grave chamber was felled in winter 970–971). Richly decorated on both sides with inlaid silver designs, the iron axe was probably a ceremonial parade weapon that was the property of a man of princely status, his burial clothes bearing elaborate embroidery and trimmed with silk and fur.

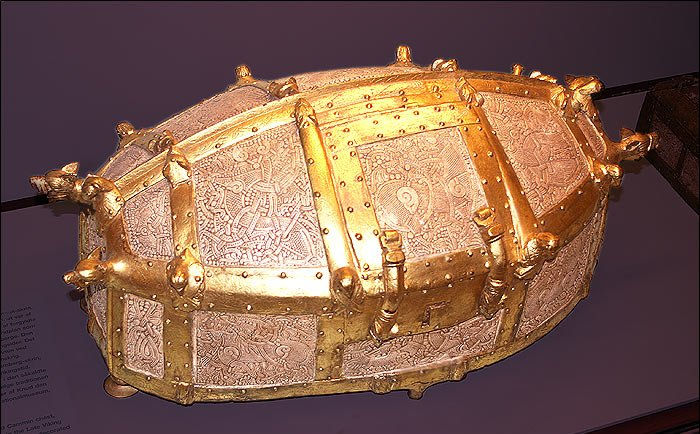
A replica of the original but lost Cammin Chest, a small late-Viking period golden reliquary in the Mammen style (Nationalmuseet).

On one face, the Mammen axe features a large bird with a pelleted body, crest, circular eye, and upright head and beak with lappet. A large shell-spiral marks the bird's hip, from which point its thinly elongated wings emerge: the right wing interlaces with the bird's neck, while the left wing interlaces with its body and tail. The outer wing edge displays a semi-circular nick typical of Mammen Style design. The tail is rendered as a triple tendril, the particular treatment of which on the Mammen axe – with open, hook-like ends – forms a characteristic of the Mammen Style as a whole. Complicating the design is the bird's head-lappet, interlacing twice with its neck and right wing, whilst also sprouting tendrils along the blade edge. At the top, near the haft, the Mammen axe features an interlaced knot on one side, a triangular human mask (with large nose, moustache and spiral beard) on the other; the latter would prove a favoured Mammen Style motif carried over from earlier styles.

On the other side, the Mammen axe bears a spreading foliate (leaf) design, emanating from spirals at the base with thin, 'pelleted' tendrils spreading and intertwining across the axe head towards the haft.

=== Ringerike Style ===
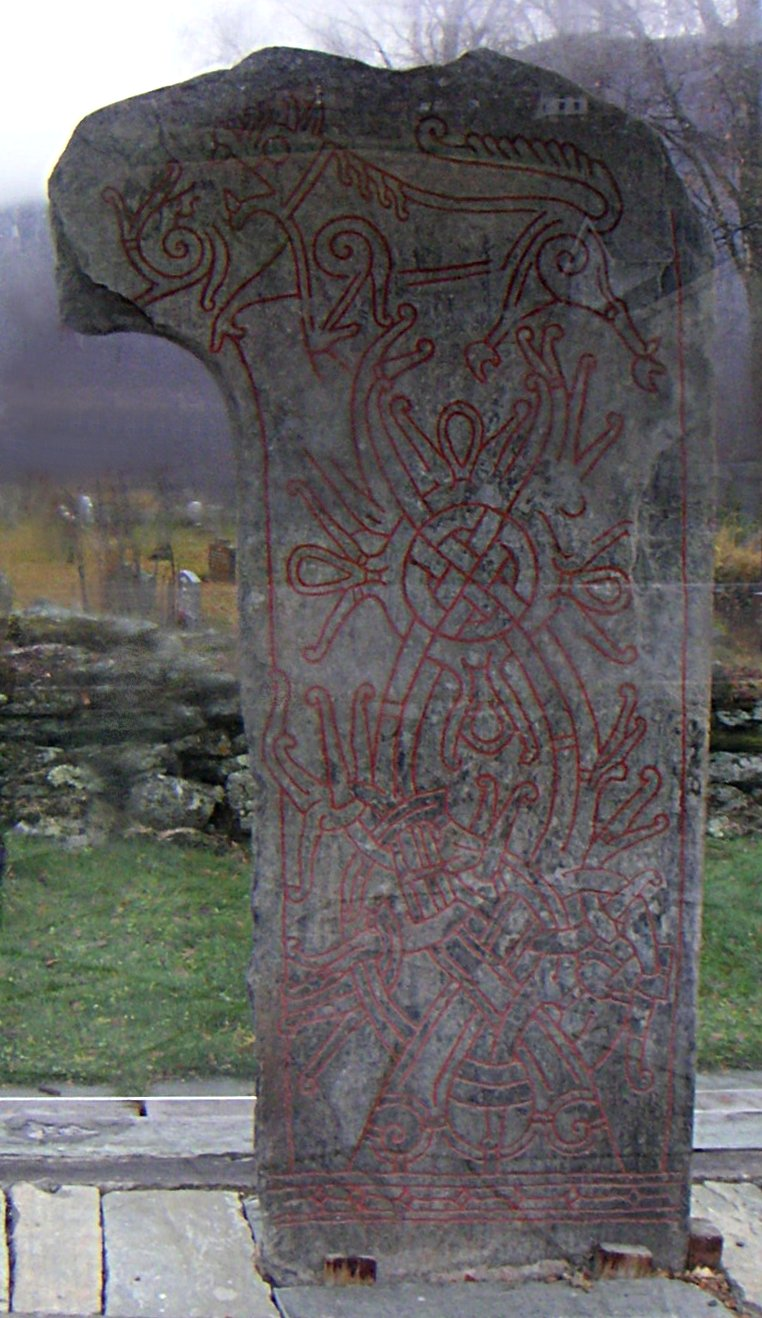
The Vang Stone

The Ringerike Style receives its name from the Ringerike district north of Oslo, Norway, where the local reddish sandstone was widely employed for carving stones with designs of the style. The type object most commonly used to define the period is a 2.15-metre (7 ft 1 in) high carved stone from Vang in Oppland. Apart from a runic memorial inscription on its right edge, the main field of the Vang Stone is filled with a balanced tendril ornament springing from two shell spirals at the base: the main stems cross twice to terminate in lobed tendrils. At the crossing, further tendrils spring from loops and pear-shaped motifs appear from the tendril centres on the upper loop. Although axial in conception, a basic asymmetry arises in the deposition of the tendrils. Surmounting the tendril pattern appears a large striding animal in double-contoured rendering with spiral hips and a lip lappet. Comparing the Vang Stone animal design with the related animal from the Mammen axe-head, the latter lacks the axiality seen in the Vang Stone and its tendrils are far less disciplined: the Mammen scroll is wavy, while the Vang scroll appears taut and evenly curved, these features marking a key difference between Mammen and Ringerike ornament. The inter-relationship between the two styles is obvious, however, when comparing the Vang Stone animal with that found on the Jelling Stone.

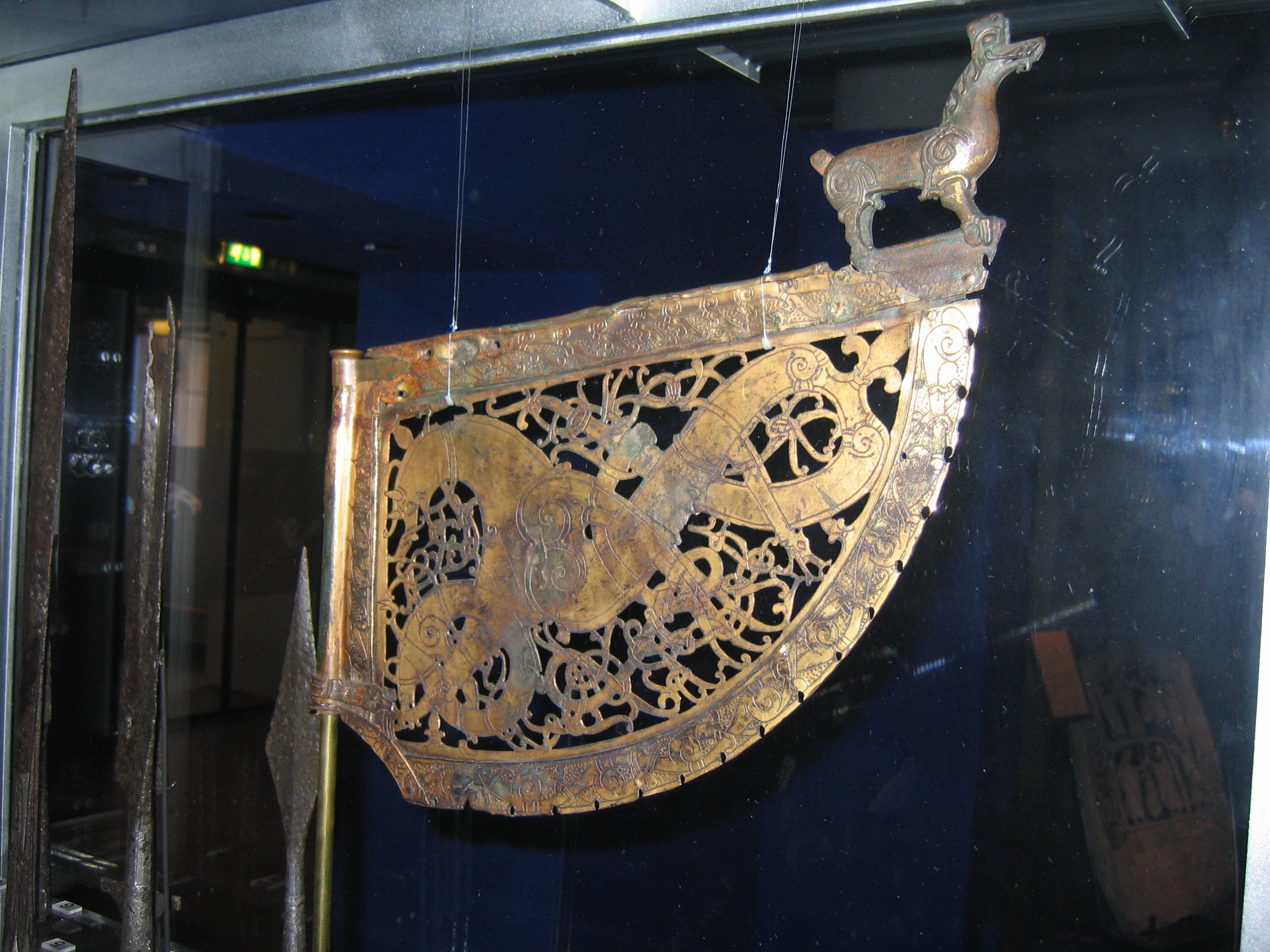
The Söderala vane, Söderala, Sweden

With regard to metalwork, Ringerike Style is best seen in two copper-gilt weather-vanes, from Källunge, Gotland and from Söderala, Hälsingland (the Söderala vane), both in Sweden. The former displays one face two axially-constructed loops in the form of snakes, which in turn sprout symmetrically-placed tendrils. The snake heads, as well as the animal and snake on the reverse, find more florid treatment than on the Vang Stone: all have lip lappets, the snakes bear pigtails, while all animals have a pear-shaped eye with the point directed towards the snout – a diagnostic feature of Ringerike Style.

The Ringerike Style evolved out of the earlier Mammen Style. It received its name from a group of runestones with animal and plant motifs in the Ringerike district north of Oslo. The most common motifs are lions, birds, band-shaped animals and spirals. Some elements appear for the first time in Scandinavian art, such as different types of crosses, palmettes and pretzel-shaped nooses that tie together two motifs. Most of the motifs have counterparts in Anglo-Saxon, Insular and Ottonian art.

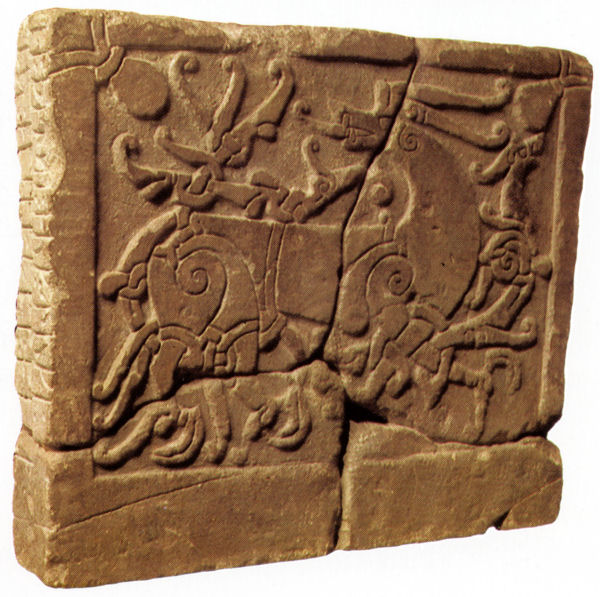
English Runic Inscription 2

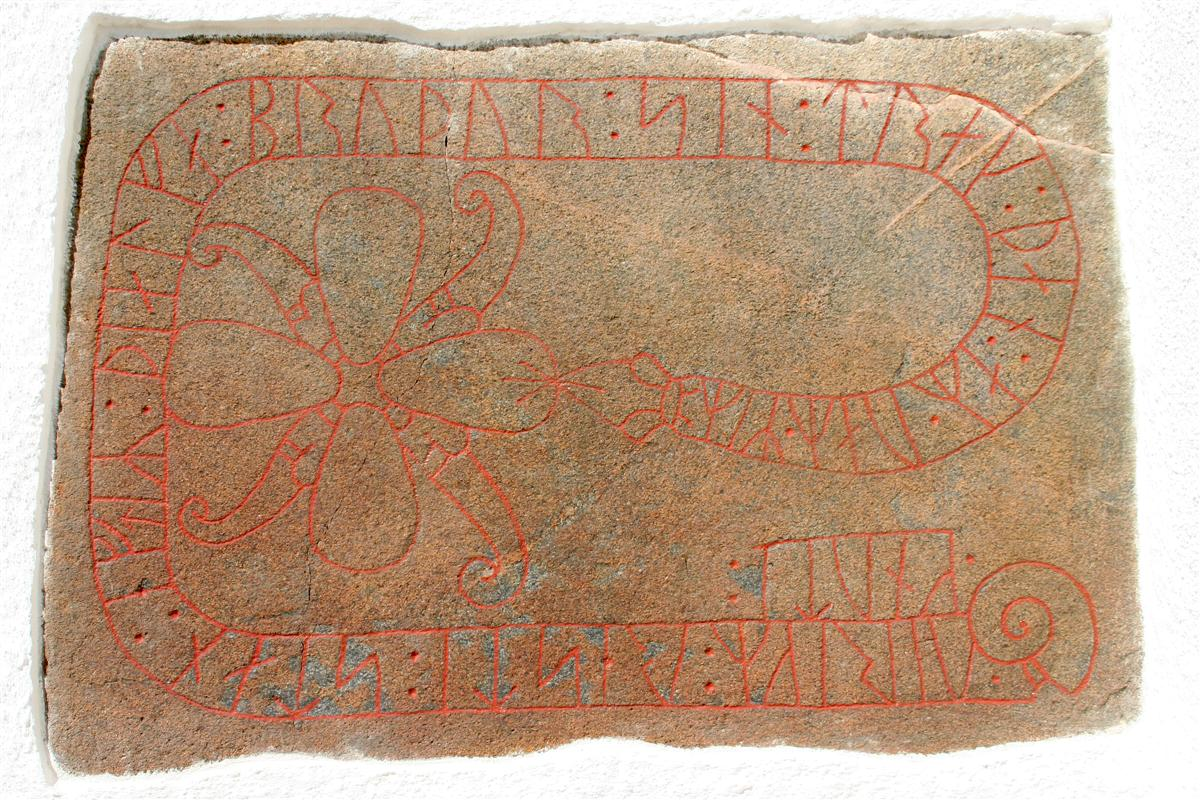
The runestone Ög 111 with a cross in Ringerike style

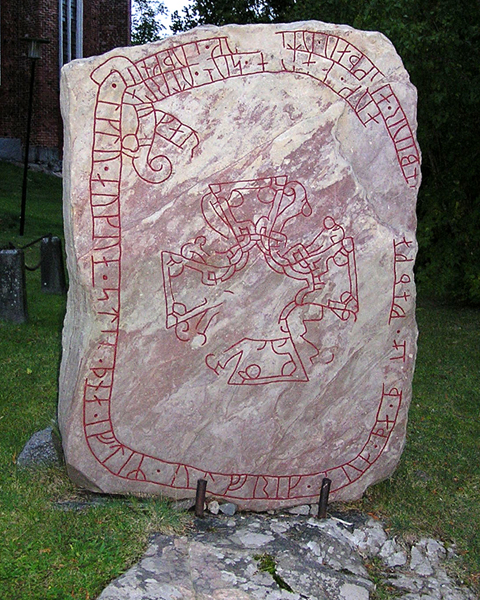
Runestone Sö 280 at Strängnäs Cathedral

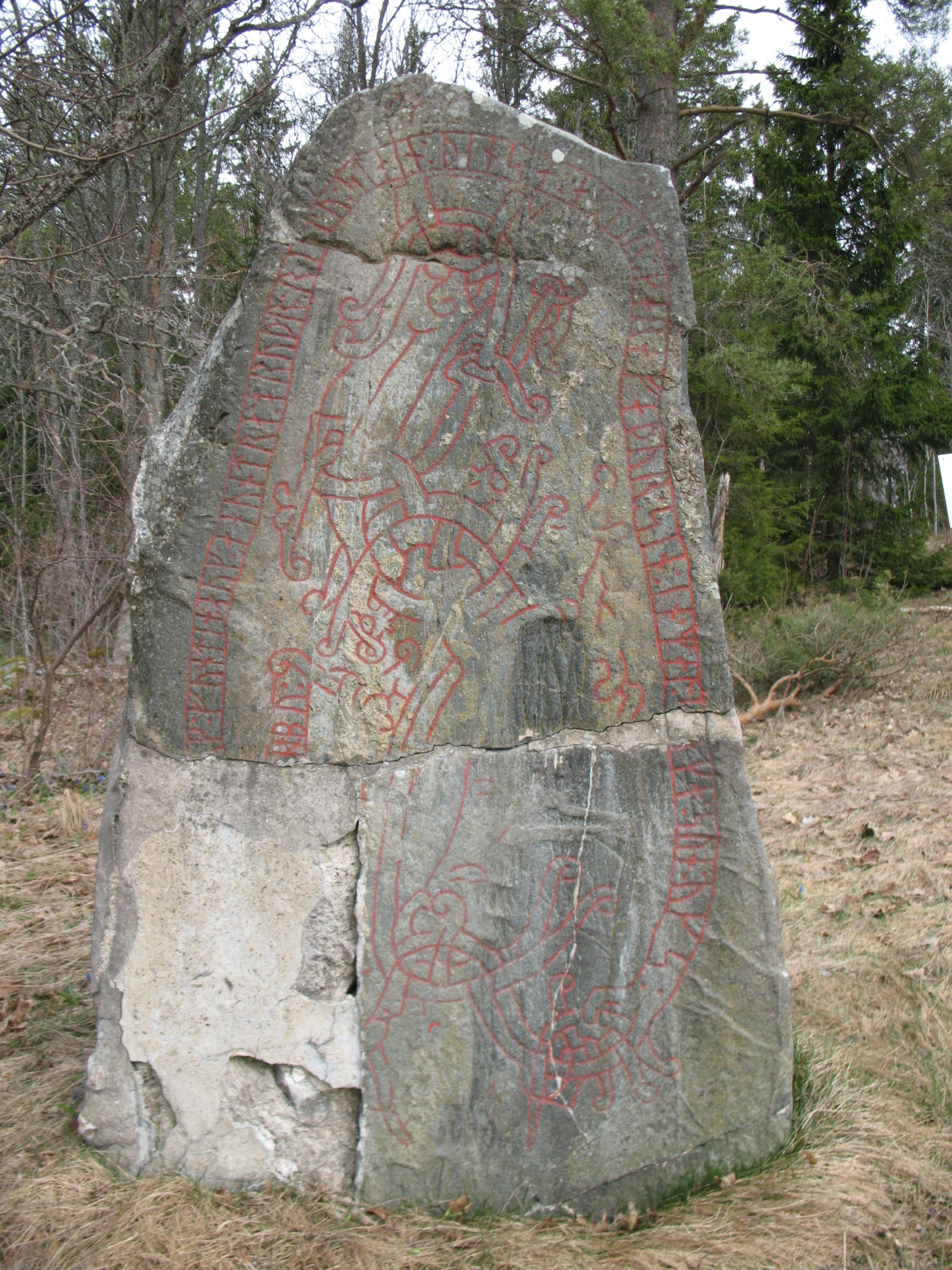
Runestone U 1146 in Gillberga, Uppland

=== Urnes Style ===
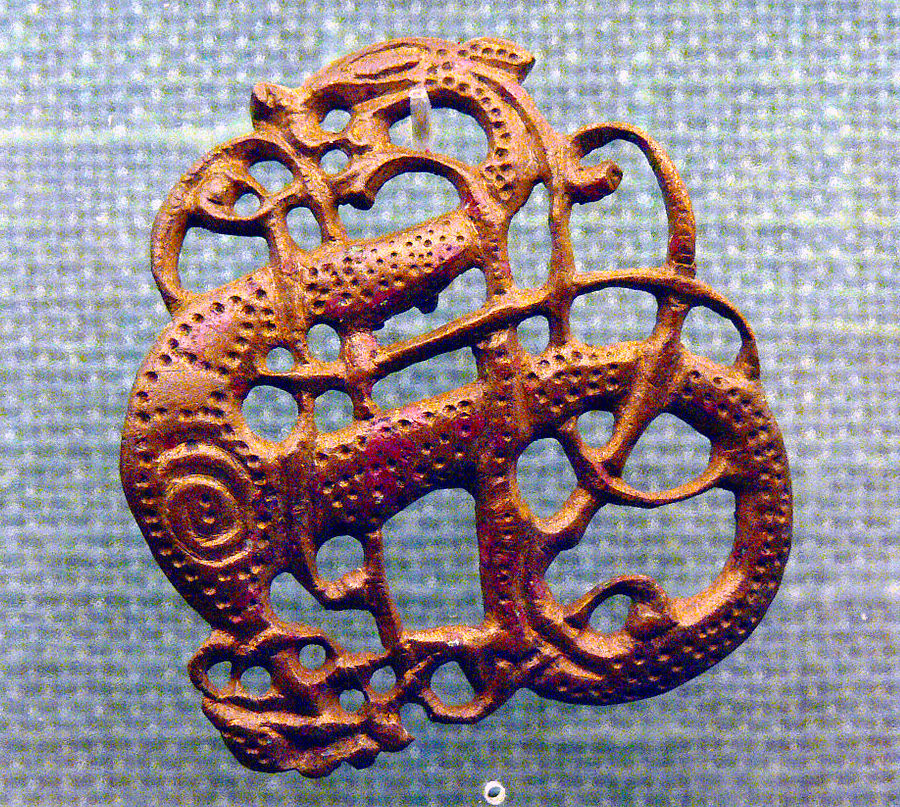
Bronze ornament from Denmark.

The Urnes Style was the last phase of Scandinavian animal art during the second half of the 11th century and in the early 12th century. The Urnes Style is named after the northern gate of the Urnes stave church in Norway, but most objects in the style are runestones in Uppland, Sweden, which is why some scholars prefer to call it the Runestone style.

The style is characterized by slim and stylised animals that are interwoven into tight patterns. The animals heads are seen in profile, they have slender almond-shaped eyes and there are upwardly curled appendages on the noses and the necks.

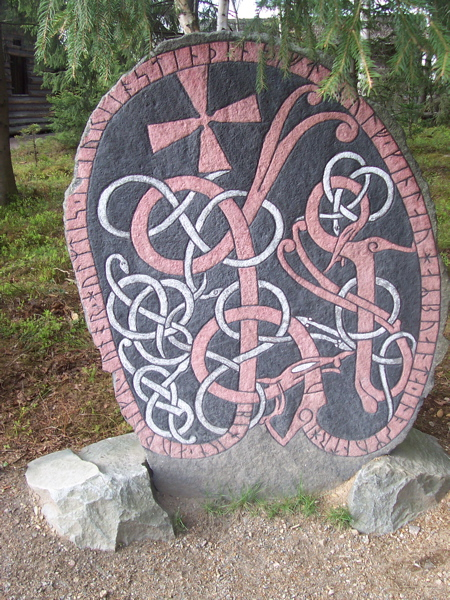
Uppland Runic Inscription 871 showing Åsmund's craftmanship in the Early Urnes Style.

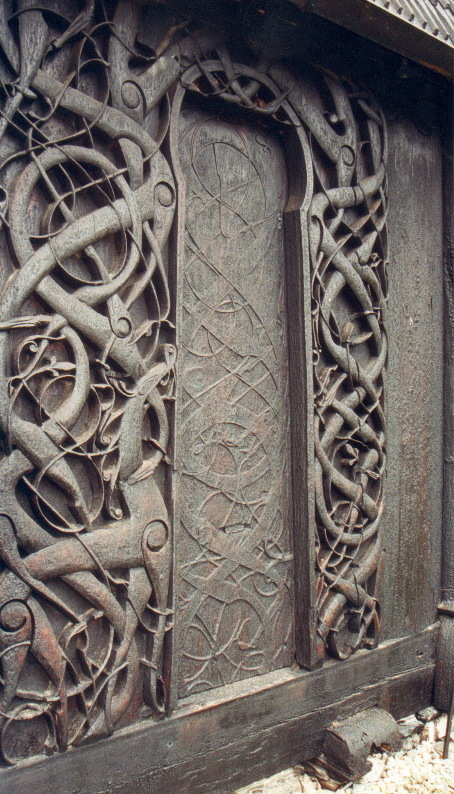
The eponymous carving on the Urnes stave church is an example of the last Urnes Style stage.

==== Early Urnes Style ====
The early style has received a dating which is mainly based on runestone U 343, runestone U 344 and a silver bowl from c. 1050, which was found at Lilla Valla. The early version of this style on runestones comprises England Runestones referring to the Danegeld and Canute the Great and works by Åsmund Kåresson.

==== Mid-Urnes Style ====
The mid-Urnes Style has received a relatively firm dating based on its appearance on coins issued by Harald Hardrada (1047–1066) and by Olav Kyrre (1080–1090). Two wood carvings from Oslo have been dated to c. 1050–1100 and the Hørning plank is dated by dendrochronology to c. 1060–1070. There is, however, evidence suggesting that the mid-Urnes style was developed before 1050 in the manner it is represented by the runemasters Fot and Balli.

==== Late Urnes Style ====
The mid-Urnes Style would stay popular side by side with the late Urnes style of the runemaster Öpir. He is famous for a style in which the animals are extremely thin and make circular patterns in open compositions. This style was not unique to Öpir and Sweden, but it also appears on a plank from Bølstad and on a chair from Trondheim, Norway.

The Jarlabanke Runestones show traits both from this late style and from the mid-Urnes style of Fot and Balli, and it was the Fot-Balli type that would mix with the Romanesque style in the 12th century.

The Vikings' art started to show how their beliefs changed as Christianity spread through Scandinavia in the late Viking age. Traditional patterns that came from myths

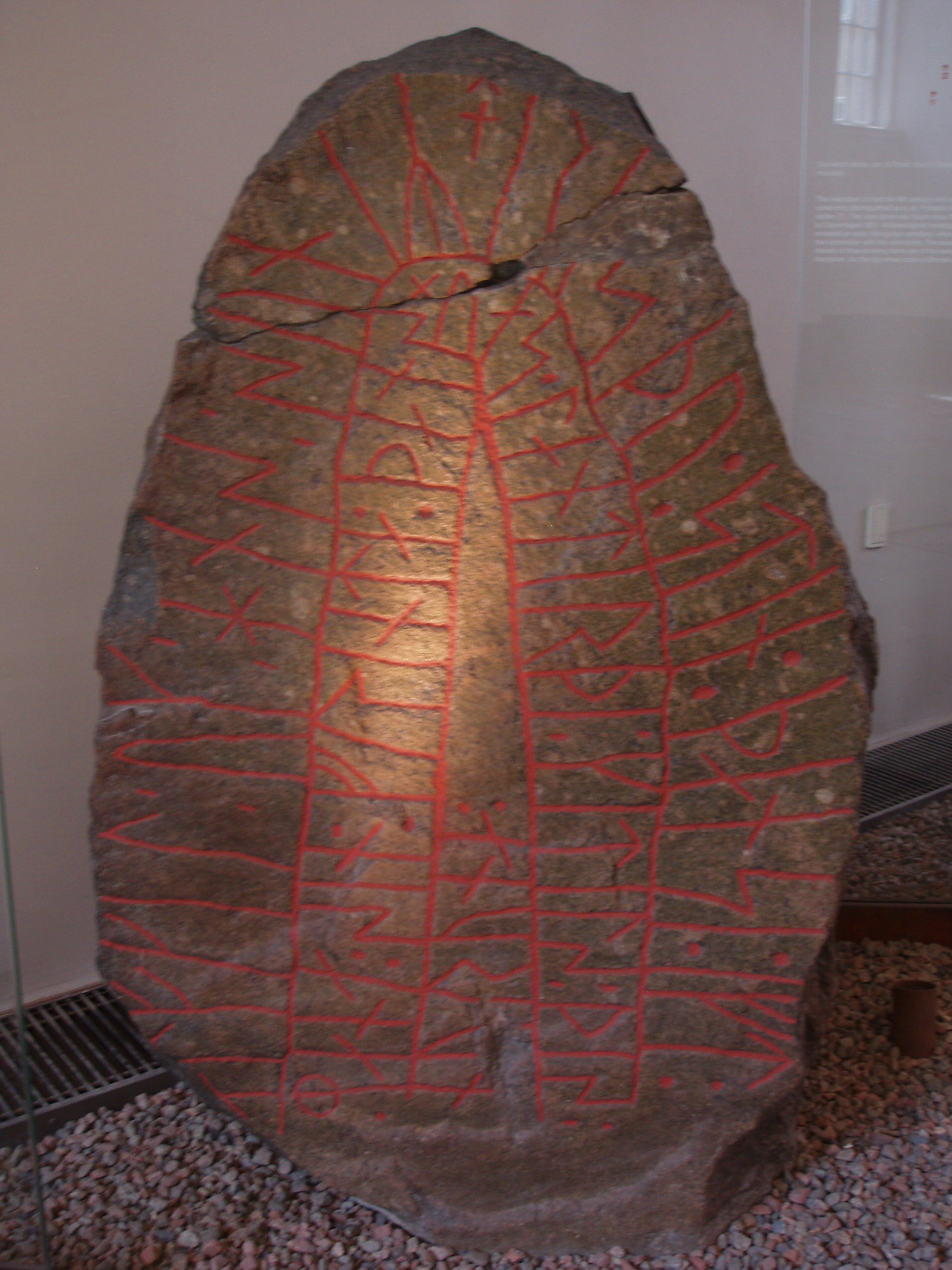
Egå Runestone II. (2008). Licensed under CC BY-SA 2.5.

and stories from other religions did not go away right away; instead, many of them were mixed with Christian symbols. This is very clear on late runestones, which sometimes have crosses next to the usual animal designs. Stone crosses and church decorations were some of the new kinds of art that came about. These works of art show how Viking art changed during a big change in religion. Instead of replacing older traditions, many artists mixed old and new images to make pieces that show both how cultures have changed and how they have stayed the same.

==== Urnes-Romanesque Style ====
The Urnes-Romanesque Style does not appear on runestones which suggests that the tradition of making runestones had died out when the mixed style made its appearance since it is well represented in Gotland and on the Swedish mainland. The Urnes-Romanesque Style can be dated independently of style thanks to representations from Oslo in the period 1100–1175, dendrochronological dating of the Lisbjerg frontal in Denmark to 1135, as well as Irish reliquaries that are dated to the second half of the 12th century.

== See also ==
- Migration Period art
- Medieval art
- Celtic art
- Anglo-Saxon art
- Insular art
- Picture stone
- Runestone styles
- Interlace
- Saint Manchan's Shrine, Urnes style adapted to Ringerike style.
