= Fredrik Mossberg =

Swedish sports shooter

Personal information
- Born: 25 February 1874 Söderala, Sweden
- Died: 14 August 1950 (aged 76) Stockholm, Sweden

Sport
- Sport: Sports shooting

Fredrik Mossberg (25 February 1874 – 14 August 1950) was a Swedish sports shooter. He competed in two events at the 1908 Summer Olympics.
