= Söderala vane =

Viking Age weather vane

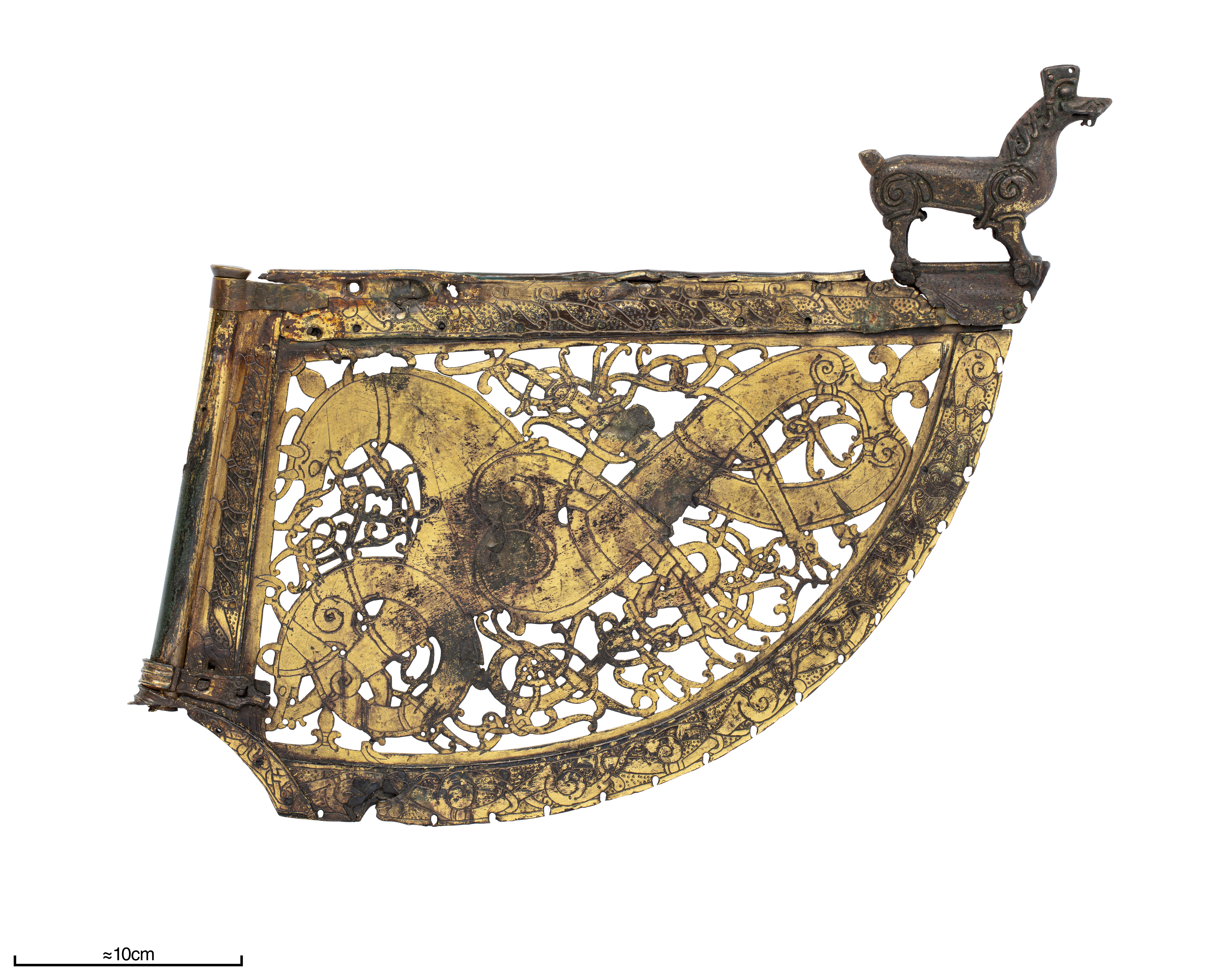
The Söderala vane

The Söderala vane (Swedish: Söderalaflöjeln) is a weather vane dating from the Viking Age, richly ornamented and made of gilt bronze. It derives its name from Söderala Church in Söderala, Sweden, where it was used as a weather vane during the 18th century. It was most probably originally used as a vane on a Viking ship, and shows signs of wear. On stylistic grounds, it has been dated to c. 1050. It is today part of the collections of the Swedish History Museum. A copy of the vane is in Söderala.

== History ==
In 1916, Västernorrlands museum bought the vane from a farmer. At the time it was attached to an iron rod from the 17th century, and the small figure of an animal attached to the top of the vane was kept separately. The farmer who sold the vane to the museum also had a receipt from the late 18th century, showing that the vane had at that time been bought from Söderala Church where it had been used as a weather vane. The farmer was paid 50 Swedish crowns for the vane, which was subsequently sold to the Swedish History Museum in Stockholm, where it has remained part of the collections of the museum since. A copy is in Söderala. The weather vane is older than the church, which is the earliest known location of the vane. On stylistic grounds it has been dated to c. 1050, and scholars believe it was originally made to be used as a weather vane on a Viking ship. Comparisons with other Viking-age vanes and analysis of mentions of such vanes in the Icelandic sagas indicate that a vane of this size and splendour may have been made for a large ship like a longship.

== Description ==
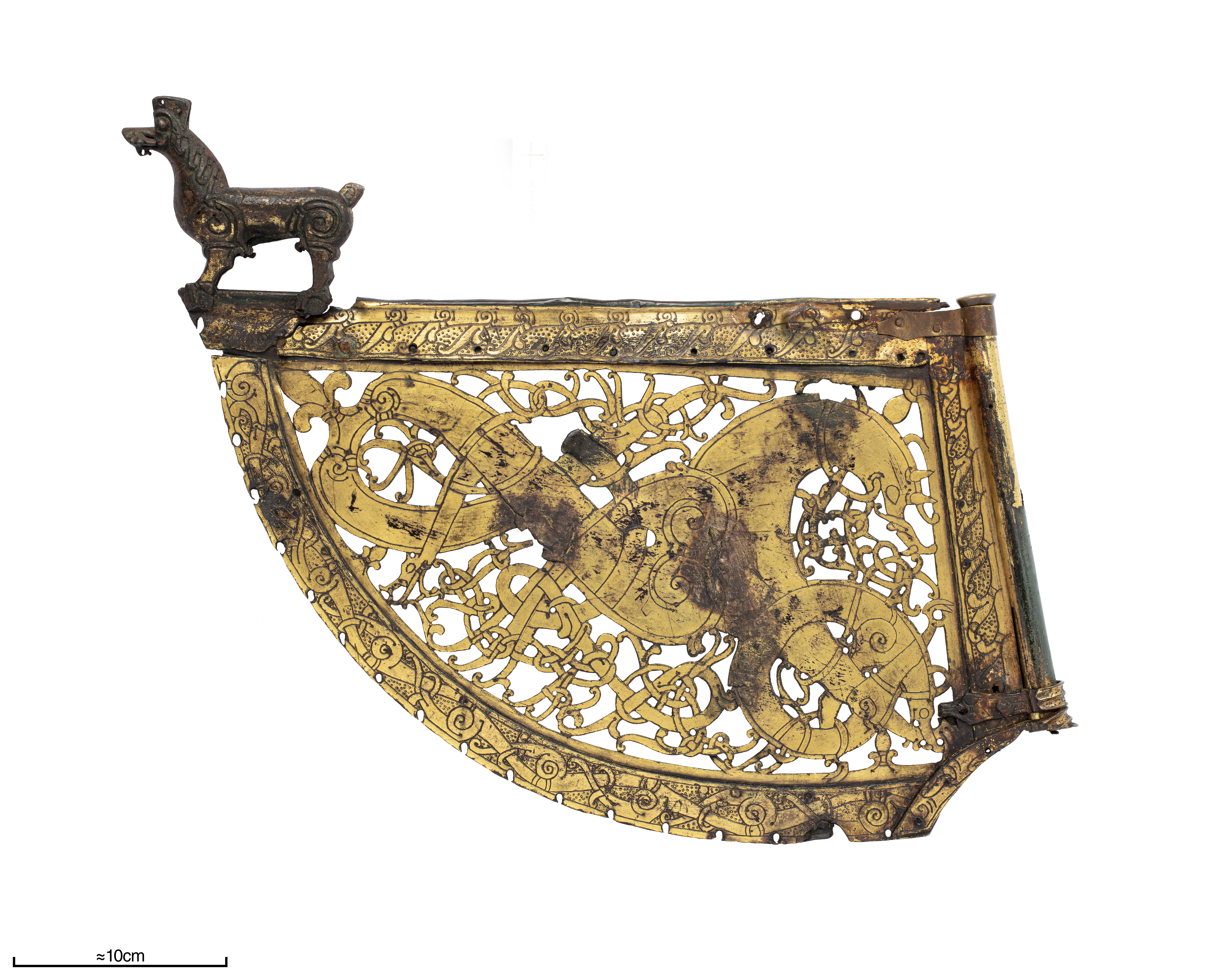
Verso side of the vane

The Söderala vane consists of a triangular plate, made of gilt bronze and reinforced by smaller bronze plates and rivets in some places. A small sculpture of an animal, kept separately from the vane when it was bought by the museum, was originally attached to the top end of the bronze plate. The curved edge of the plate is pierced by several small holes, in which some kind of loosely hanging decorations may once have been attached. The plate itself is decorated with depictions of three beasts, interlaced with each other and with other purely decorative elements such as spirals, in a style closely related to that of Swedish burial monuments from the middle of the 11th century. The main decorative element is a depiction of a Norse dragon with wings, its forelegs and neck stretched somewhat like a horse about to rise. Its back is comparatively small. The dragon is very similar to a dragon depicted on a tombstone from the mid-11th century from Sundby Church in Södermanland, Sweden. Another creature lies coiled around the forelegs of the dragon, while the third, legless, is wrapped around the body of the dragon.

The vane has traces of continuous use as a weather vane, presumably on a ship, and had been repaired before it was converted for use as a church weather vane. Apart from wear, it has also been somewhat buckled as a result of considerable violence, possibly by being hit by projectiles during some battle.

It is not known where the vane was made. It is comparable with other Viking art objects from the same time from Sweden, but there are also details in the vane which show similarities with insular art, particularly Irish art. For instance, the wing and head of the dragon are comparable with similar ornamentation known from the British Isles, and the animal crowning the vane is similar to one depicted on an Irish crosier. It has therefore been speculated that the vane could have been made in present-day Sweden but also that it may have been made by Norse settlers on the British Isles.

== Sources cited ==
- Salin, Bernhard (1921). "Förgylld flöjel från Söderala kyrka" [Gilded vane from Söderala Church] (PDF). Fornvännen. Journal of Swedish Antiquarian Research (in Swedish). 16: 1–22.
