= Mare Kandre =

Swedish writer (1962–2005)

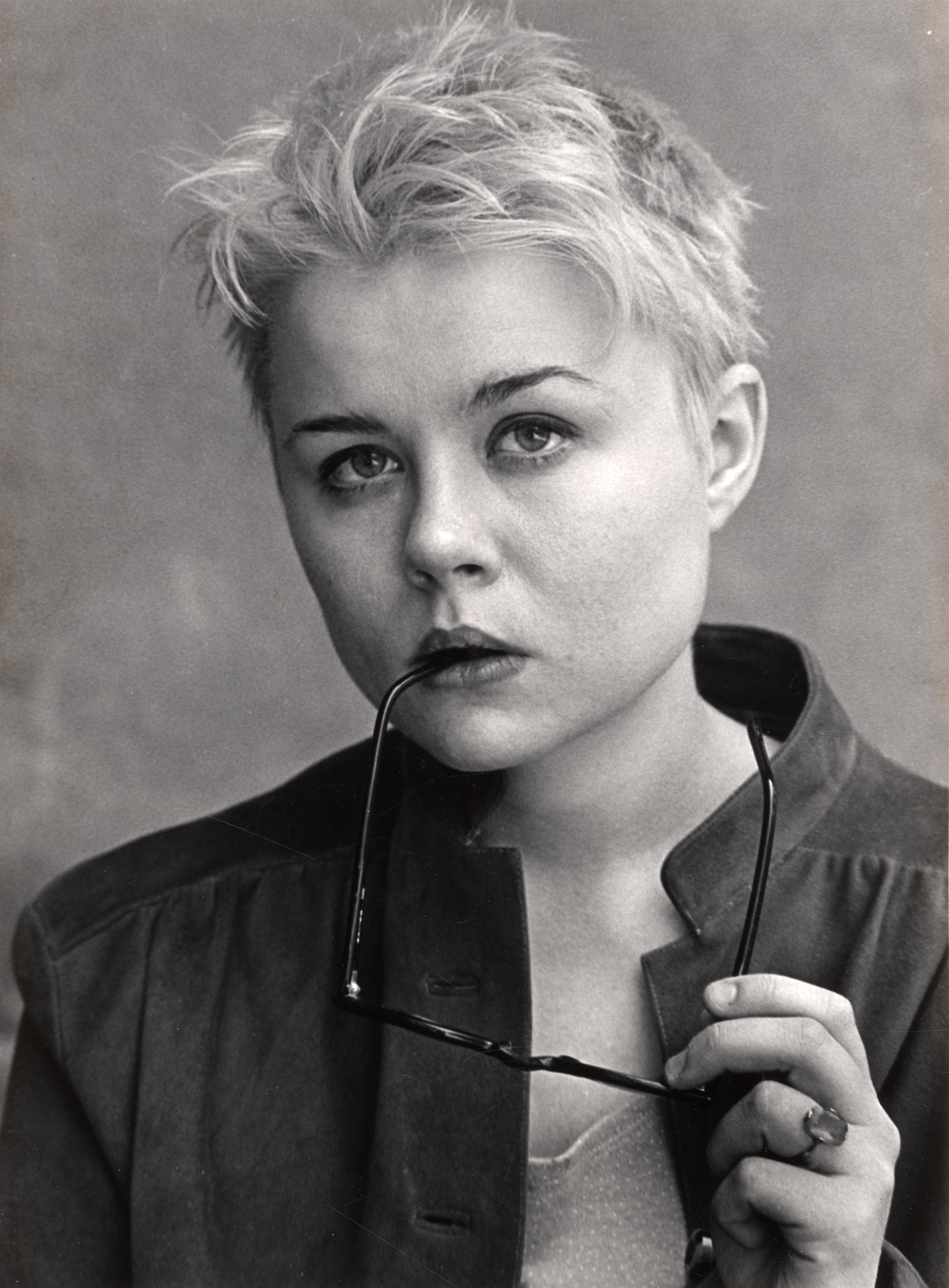
- Kandre in 1988
- Born: Mare Ingrid Hansson; 27 May 1962; Söderala, Sweden
- Died: 24 March 2005 (aged 42)

Mare Kandre (27 May 1962 – 24 March 2005) was a Swedish author.

Mare Ingrid Hansson was born on 27 May 1962 in Söderala. Her mother, whose maiden name was Kandre, was a biologist who had fled Estonia during World War II. Kandre grew up in Gothenburg.

Between 1967 and 1969, she lived with her family in British Columbia, Canada, a period which made a very deep impression on her and later in life influenced her writing.

Kandre achieved considerable acclaim in Scandinavia and her works have been translated into more than eight languages. Her novels, short stories and prose poetry often deals with children's, in particular girls', development to adulthood; women's roles; and marginalized and traumatized individuals who opt to break with society's expectations.

Kandre's stories have a marked metaphysical dimension which is strengthened by her poetical language and representation, with existential themes paired with contemporary social issues. In her writing she often returns to issues like the expectations placed on women, how alienation develops, and the significance of instincts. Several of her books were influenced by Gothic fiction.

In 1991, she won the Aftonbladet Literary Prize.

Before Kandre entered onto the path of writing, she was the frontwoman for the music group Global Infantilists (1981–1983).

She died on 24 March 2005 of a drug overdose, at the age of 42. She had one son.

== Works ==
- I ett annat land (In Another Country): prose (1984)
- Bebådelsen (The Annunciation): prose poetry (1986)
- Bübins unge (Bübin's kid): novel (1987). Translated into Serbian 2010, titled Bimbinino dete
- Det brinnande trädet (The Burning Tree): novel (1988)
- Aliide, Aliide : novel (1991). Translated into Danish, Norwegian and German with the same title
- Deliria : novel (1992)
- Quinnan och Dr Dreuf (The Woman and Dr Dreuf) : novel (1994). Translations: Danish, titled: Quinden og doktor Dreuf, French, titled: La femme et le docteur Dreuf Russian, titled Женщина и доктор Дpeйф and Estonian, titled Naene ja Dr Dreuf
- Djävulen och Gud (The Devil and God): novel (1994). Slovak translation: Diabol a Boh. German translation: Der Teufel und Gott
- Bestiarium : novel (1999)
- Hetta och vitt (Heat and White): short stories (2001)
- Xavier: novel (2002)

Mare Kandre also wrote drama. Of these Vilse ("Lost") has been staged by several theatres.

== Prizes and distinctions ==
- Scholarship, The Swedish Academy (1984)
- Scholarship, The Swedish Authors' Fund (1985)
- Aftonbladet Literary Prize (1991)
- Alfred Bonnier's Centennial Award (1991)
- De Nios Vinterpris (The Nine's Winter Prize) (1996)
- The Kalleberger scholarship, The Swedish Academy (1999)
- Göteborgs-Posten's literature prize (2000)
- Award, Alfred Bonnier's Fund for Swedish Writers (2001)
- The Dobloug prize, The Swedish Academy (2003)
- Mare Kandre also held a long-term writer scholarship from The Swedish Writers’ Union

== Style and legacy ==
The Mare Kandre Prize is presented at Stockholm's International Poetry Festival. The prize was established in memory of Mare Kandre, who was mourned by a large number of readers after her premature death, and it is given to a writer whose work continues in Kandre's literary spirit. It has been presented at the festival since 2006 in collaboration with Mare Kandre's family.
