= Signe Horn Fuglesang =

Norwegian art historian

Signe Horn Fuglesang (born 1938) is a Norwegian art historian and professor emerita at the University of Oslo, best known for her published research and writings on Viking art.

She is a fellow of the Norwegian Academy of Science and Letters.

== Bibliography ==
- Fuglesang, S.H. (1980). Some Aspects of the Ringerike Style: A Phase of 11th Century Scandinavian Art, [Mediaeval Scandinavia Supplements], University Press of Southern Denmark: Odense, 1980. ISBN 9788774921837
- Fuglesang, S.H. (2013). "Copying and Creativity in Early Viking Ornament", in Reynolds, A. and Webster, L. (eds) (2013), Early Medieval Art and Archaeology in the Northern World—Studies in Honour of James Graham-Campbell, Brill: Leiden and Boston, 2013. ISBN 9789004235038, pp. 825–841.
