= Gorm's Cup =

Silver cup buried with Gorm the Old

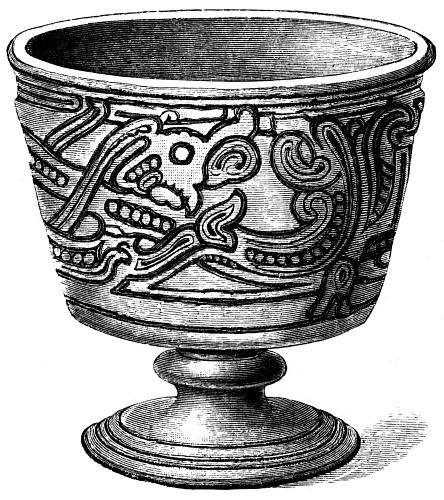
Illustration of Gorm's Cup, A short history of the english People, 1902.

Gorm's Cup, also known as the Jelling Cup, is a small silver cup buried with the Danish king Gorm the Old, c. 958/959.

The cup is well preserved and is the best known find from the mounds at Jelling. Despite heavy-handed restoration, the cup remains an example of fine expression in silversmithing and metal-technological skills of the Viking Age.

It was found on 18 September 1820 in the burial chamber at Nordhøjen in Jelling, considered the burial mound of Queen Thyra, but may have also served as the first burial site of Gorm the Old.

== Context ==
The cup was found in the huge double barrow in which king Gorm the Old, founder of the Danish monarchy (c. 900–936), and his wife Thyra, were buried side by side at Jelling, Jutland.

== Artistry ==
The Jelling cup bears a style of special ornamentation also associated with the Jelling stones, being aptly called Jelling style. Characterised by ribbon-like stylised animal motifs and band-shaped bodies of animals that intertwine into S-curves. It bridges the earlier Borre style with the later Mamman style. It is also found on Harald Bluetooth's great runestone and on other objects ca. 900-975 AD.

The cup is decorated in the Jelling style with niello and gilding, the inside of the cup is gilded as well.

The Jelling style revives the motif of the ribbon animal while still keeping the highly geometric interlacing patterns of its predecessor Borre style.

== Description ==
The Jelling cup is 4.3 cm high, weighing 120.56 grams, made of two parts, the cup proper and the foot with profiled stem, they were cast separately and then assembled. The foot is solid, both are cast from almost pure silver.

The cup can be seen at the National Museum in Denmark.

== See also ==
- Viking art
- Animal style
- Old Norse religion
- Harald Bluetooth
