= Mammen (village) =

- Village
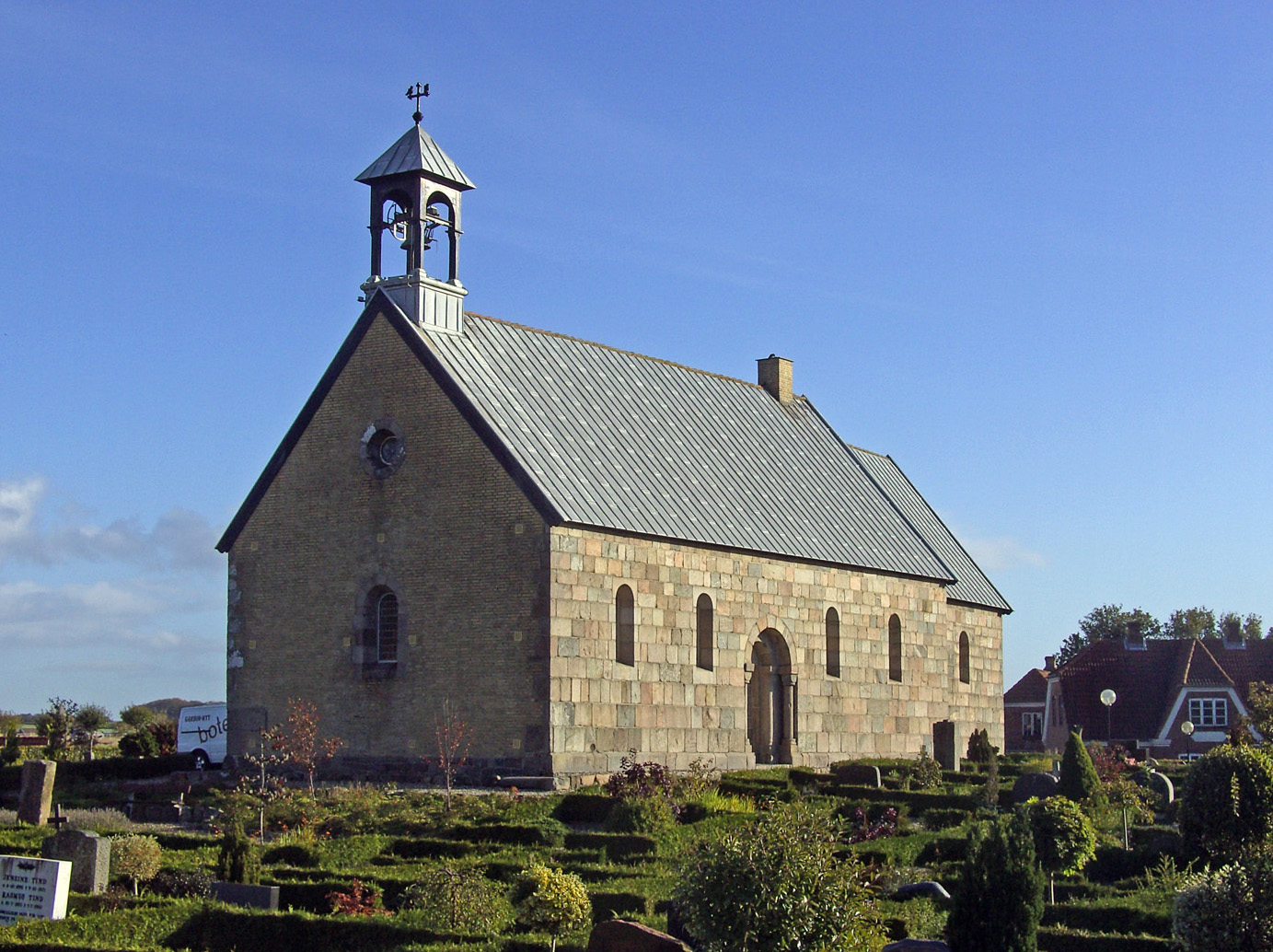
- Mammen church

- Location in Denmark Mammen (Central Denmark Region)
- Coordinates: 56°24′39″N 9°36′47″E
- Country: Denmark
- Region: Central Denmark (Midtjylland)
- Municipality: Viborg

Population (2026)
  - Total: 279
- Time zone: UTC+1 (Central European Time)
  - Summer (DST): UTC+2 (Central European Summer Time)

Mammen is a village in Viborg Municipality, Denmark 7 km north of Bjerringbro.

Mammen is recognized as the production site of Mammen cheese, a well known brand in Denmark.

== Mammen chamber tomb ==
The Mammen area was the finding site of the famous and rich Mammen chamber tomb; a Viking Age chamber tomb, complete with the remains and offerings of a wealthy magnate burial in the winter of 970-71 AD. The tomb was opened in 1868, when a farmer began digging away at the mound of Bjerringhøj. At about the same time, a hoard was unearthed close by in a gravel quarry. The various objects of both finds later gave name to the so-called Mammen style, an art phase typical of Scandinavia. The objects are displayed at the National Museum of Denmark in Copenhagen.

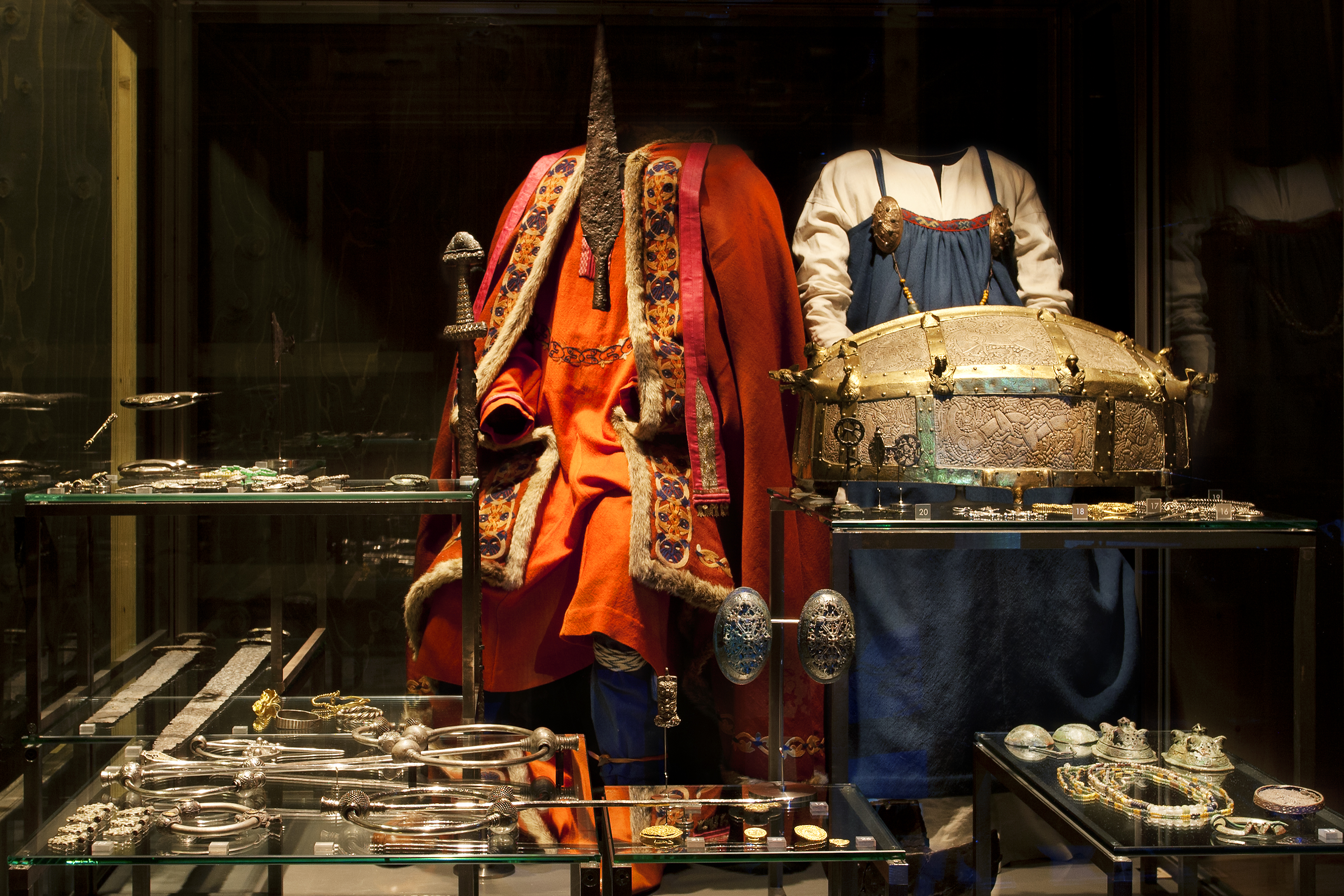
Reconstructed attire and objects from the Mammen chamber tomb and hoard. The golden chest is a replica of the lost Cammin Chest and not from this find, but crafted in the Mammen style.

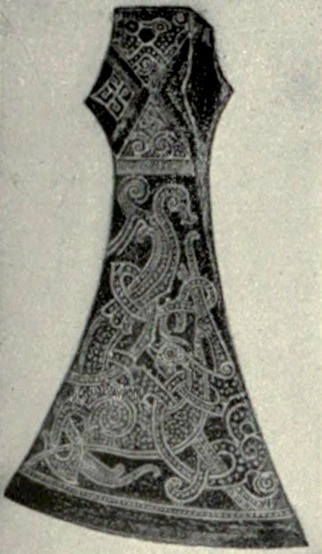
Silver adorned iron axe, probably a ceremonial weapon.
