= Söderala =

- Location within Sweden Gävleborg Location within Sweden
- Coordinates: 61°17′N 16°58′E
- Country: Sweden
- Province: Hälsingland
- County: Gävleborg County
- Municipality: Söderhamn Municipality

Area
  - Total: 1.68 km^{2} (0.65 sq mi)

Population (31 December 2010)
  - Total: 949
  - Density: 564/km^{2} (1,460/sq mi)
- Time zone: UTC+1 (CET)
  - Summer (DST): UTC+2 (CEST)

Söderala is a locality situated in Söderhamn Municipality, Gävleborg County, Sweden with 949 inhabitants in 2010.

Writer Mare Kandre (1962–2005), was born in Söderala. Olympic sports shooter Fredrik Mossberg (1874-1950) was also born there.

Viking Age Söderala vane, now in the Swedish History Museum in Stockholm was used as a weather vane of Söderala Church until the 18th century.
