= Norsemen =

Historical linguistic group of people originating in Scandinavia

The Norsemen (or Northmen) were a Germanic cultural group in the Early Middle Ages, originating among speakers of Old Norse in Scandinavia. During the late eighth century, Scandinavians embarked on a large-scale expansion in all directions, giving rise to the Viking Age. In English-language scholarship since the 19th century, Norse seafaring traders, settlers and warriors have commonly been referred to as Vikings.

Historians of Anglo-Saxon England often use the term "Norse" in a different sense, distinguishing between Norse Vikings (Norsemen) from Norway, who mainly invaded and occupied the islands north and north-west of Britain as well as Ireland and western Britain, and Danish Vikings, who principally invaded and occupied eastern Britain. (Note: For example: "Most of the earliest Viking settlers in Ireland were Norsemen, but c.850 a large Danish Host arrived" (Peter Hunter Blair, An Introduction to Anglo-Saxon England, 3rd ed., 2003, pp. 66–67); "In 875 Danes and Norsemen were competing" for control of Scotland (Peter Sawyer, The Oxford Illustrated History of the Vikings, 1997, p. 90); Frank Stenton distinguishes between the "Danish kingdom of York" and the "Norse kingdom of York", and refers in the mid-tenth century to "the antagonism between Danes and Norsemen, which is often ignored by modern writers, but underlies the whole history in this period" (Anglo-Saxon England, 3rd ed., 1971, pp. 359, 765); Barbara Yorke comments that the Chronicle tends to use the term "Danish" for all Scandinavian forces, but the attackers on Portland in the late eighth century seem to have been "predominantly Norse adventurers, but some way from their normal raiding grounds in Britain" (Wessex in the Early Middle Ages, 1995. p. 108); in 793: "The hit-and-run raid on Lindisfarne was probably the work of Norse rather than Danish warriors, straying from their accustomed haunts in the Faroes and Orkney down the North Sea coast of Britain in search of easy loot" (N. J. Higham, The Kingdom of Northumberland AD 350–1100, 1993, p. 173).)

== History of the terms Norseman and Northman ==
The word Norseman first appears in English during the early 19th century: the earliest attestation given in the third edition of the Oxford English Dictionary is from Walter Scott's 1817 Harold the Dauntless. The word was coined using the adjective norse, which was borrowed into English from Dutch during the 16th century with the sense 'Norwegian', and which by Scott's time had acquired the sense "of or relating to Scandinavia or its language, esp[ecially] in ancient or medieval times". As with modern use of the word viking, therefore, the word norseman has no particular basis in medieval usage.

The term Norseman does echo terms meaning 'Northman', applied to Norse-speakers by the peoples they encountered during the Middle Ages. The Old Frankish word Nortmann ("Northman") was Latinised as Normannus and was widely used in Latin texts. The Latin word Normannus then entered Old French as Normands. From this word came the name of the Normans and of Normandy, which was settled by Norsemen in the tenth century.

The same word entered Hispanic languages and local varieties of Latin with forms beginning not only in n-, but in l-, such as lordomanni (apparently reflecting nasal dissimilation in local Romance languages). This form may in turn have been borrowed into Arabic: the prominent early Arabic source al-Mas‘ūdī identified the 844 raiders on Seville not only as Rūs but also al-lawdh’āna.

The Anglo-Saxon Chronicle, written in Old English, distinguishes between the pagan Norwegian Norsemen (Norðmenn) of Dublin and the Christian Danes (Dene) of the Danelaw. In 942, it records the victory of King Edmund I over the Norse kings of York: "The Danes were previously subjected by force under the Norsemen, for a long time in bonds of captivity to the heathens".

== Other names ==
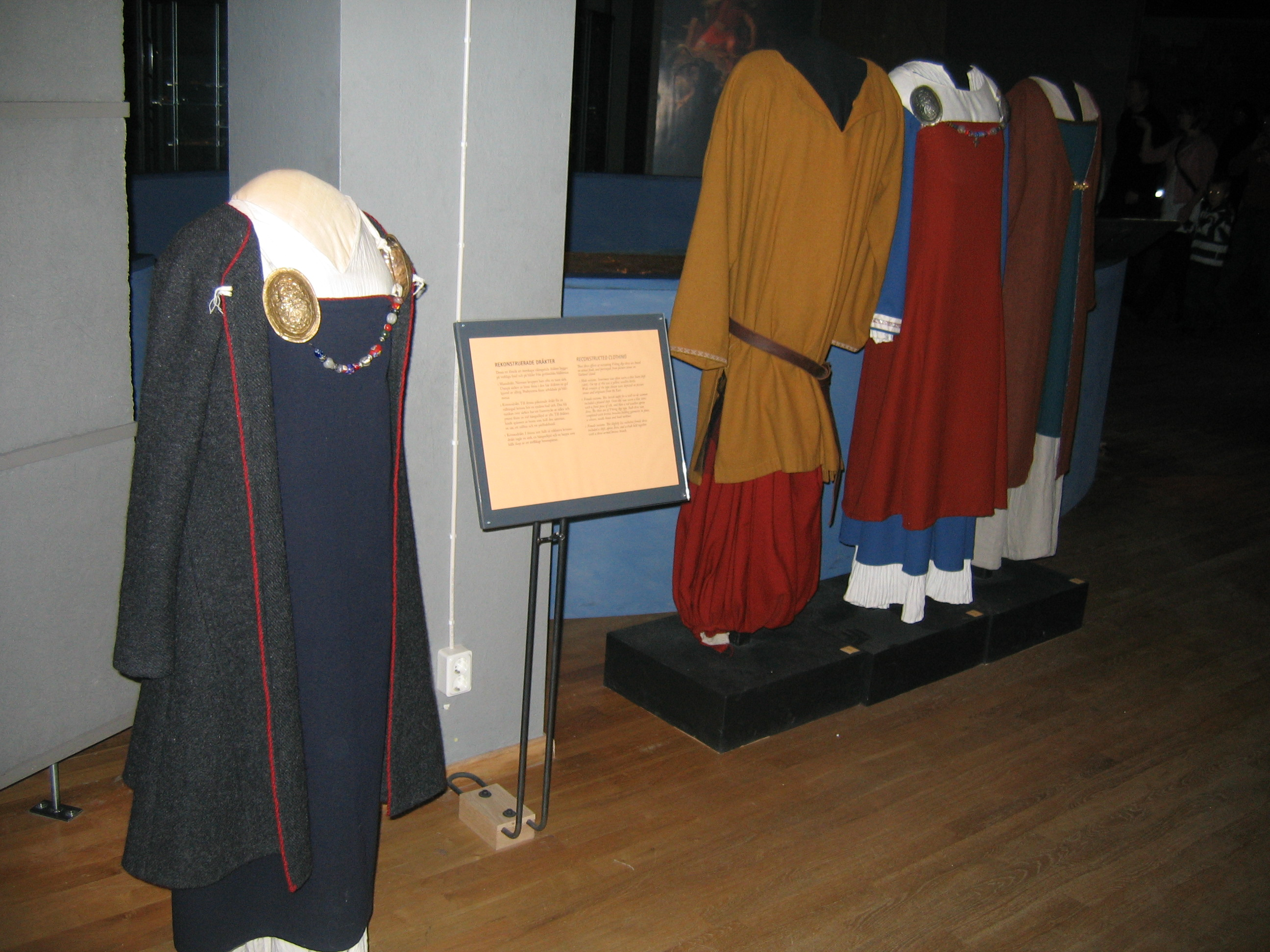
Norse clothing

In modern scholarship, Vikings is a common term for attacking Norsemen, especially in connection with raids and monastic plundering by Norsemen in the British Isles, but it was not used in this sense at the time. In Old Norse and Old English, the word simply meant 'pirate'.

The Norse were also known as Ascomanni, ashmen, by the Germans, Lochlanach (Norse) by the Gaels and Dene (Danes) by the Anglo-Saxons.

The Gaelic terms Finn-Gall (Norwegian Viking or Norwegian), Dubh-Gall (Danish Viking or Danish) and Gall Goidel (foreign Gaelic) were used for the people of Norse descent in Ireland and Scotland, who assimilated into the Gaelic culture. The Norse inhabitants of Dublin were known as the Ostmen, a term meaning “men of the east”. The name Oxmanstown (an area in central Dublin; the name is still current) comes from one of their settlements. They were also known in Gaelic as Lochlannaigh, from Lochlann, a name used for Scandinavia or Norway.

The Slavs, the Arabs and the Byzantines knew them as the Rus' or Rhōs (Ῥῶς), probably derived from various uses of rōþs-, i.e. "related to rowing", or from the area of Roslagen in east-central Sweden, where most of the Northmen who visited the Eastern Slavic lands originated.

Archaeologists and historians of today believe that these Scandinavian settlements in the East Slavic lands formed the names of the countries of Russia and Belarus.

The Slavs and the Byzantines also called them Varangians (Old Norse: Væringjar, meaning "sworn men"), and the Scandinavian bodyguards of the Byzantine emperors were known as the Varangian Guard.

Modern descendants of Norsemen are described as Scandinavians.

== Geography ==
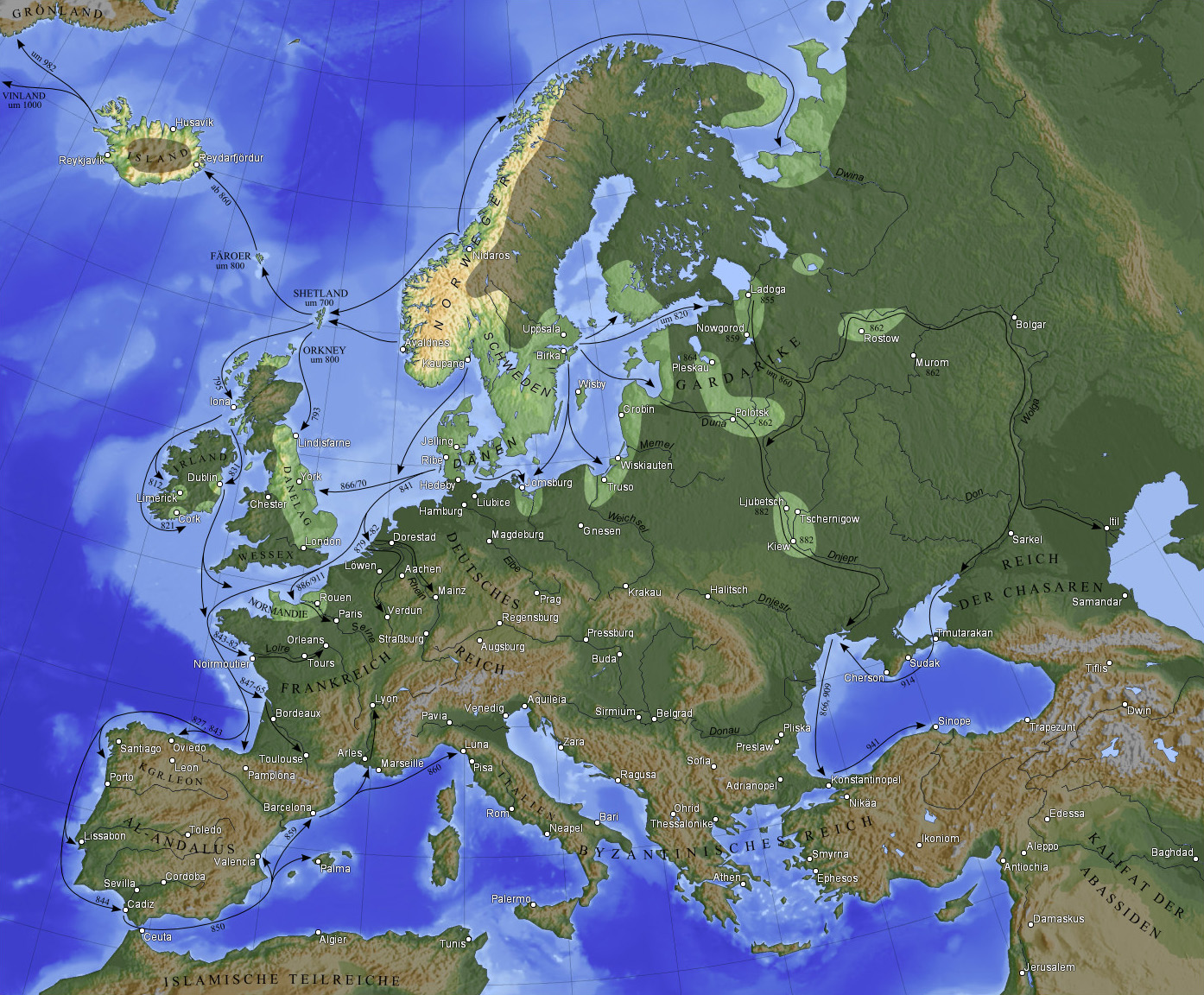
Exploration and expansion routes of Norsemen

The British conception of the Vikings' origins was inaccurate. Those who plundered Britain lived in what is today Denmark, Scania, the western coast of Sweden and Norway (up to almost the 70th parallel) and along the Swedish Baltic coast up to around the 60th latitude and Lake Mälaren. They also came from the island of Gotland, Sweden. The border between the Norsemen and more southerly Germanic tribes, the Danevirke, today is located about 50 kilometres (31 mi) south of the Danish–German border. The southernmost living Vikings lived no further north than Newcastle upon Tyne, and travelled to Britain more from the east than from the north.

The Norse Scandinavians established polities and settlements in what are now Great Britain (England, Scotland, Wales), Ireland, Iceland, Russia, Belarus, France, Sicily, Belgium, Ukraine, Estonia, Latvia, Lithuania, Germany, Poland, Greenland, Canada, and the Faroe Islands.

== Notable Norse people ==
- Aud the Deep-Minded (c. 9th century CE), ship captain and early settler of Iceland
- Harald Bluetooth (died c. 985/86 CE), king of Denmark and Norway, namesake of the Bluetooth wireless technology
- Bolli Bollason (born c. 1000 CE), prominent Icelandic warrior and member of the Varangian Guard
- Cnut (c.995-1035 CE) Danish King who ruled England, Denmark, Norway and parts of Sweden, creating the North Sea Empire.
- Freydís Eiríksdóttir (born c. 970 CE), explorer and early colonist of Vinland
- Erik the Red (c. 950–1003 CE), Norwegian explorer and founder of the first settlement in Greenland
- Leif Erikson (c. 970–1020 CE), Icelandic explorer thought to have been the first European to have set foot on continental North America
- Estrid (c. 11th century CE), powerful Swedish magnate and matriarch
- Harald Fairhair (c. 850–932 CE), the first King of Norway
- Harald Hardrada (c. 1015 – 25 September 1066 CE), also known as Harald III of Norway, given the epithet Hardrada in the sagas, was King of Norway from 1046 to 1066
- Gunnborga (c. 11th century CE), Swedish runemaster responsible for the Hälsingland Rune Inscription 21
- Hildr Hrólfsdóttir (c. 9th century CE), Norwegian skald known for her poetry concerning the banishment of her father Rolv Nevia, the Viking jarl of Trondheim
- Olaf the White (c. 820 – late 9th century CE), Viking sea-king, King of Dublin, and husband of Aud the Deep-Minded
- Ragnar Lodbrok (c. 9th century CE), legendary Viking hero and king
- Þorbjörg Lítilvölva (c. 10th century CE), renowned seeress of Norse colonial Greenland
- Gunnlaugr ormstunga (c. 983–1008 CE), Icelandic skald who widely served in Iceland, Norway, Ireland, Orkney, and Sweden
- Raud the Strong (c. late 10th century CE), Norwegian blót priest and seafaring warrior
- Steinunn Refsdóttir (c. 10th century CE), Icelandic skald known for her verses taunting the Christian missionary Þangbrandr
- Rusla (c. 5th–11th century CE), a.k.a. the "Red Woman", legendary Norwegian pirate fleet leader
- Steinvör Sighvatsdóttir (died 1271 CE), influential Icelandic matriarch and skald
- Swein Forkbeard (Died 1014 CE), King of Denmark and briefly of England; overlord of Norway.
- Egill Skallagrímsson (c. 904–995), Icelandic war poet, sorcerer, berserker, farmer, and anti-hero of Egil's Saga
- Snorri Sturluson (1179–1241), Icelandic historian, poet, politician, and lawspeaker of the Althing whose work comprises a major source of Norse mythology
- Thorkell the Tall (c. early 11th century CE), Danish warlord
- Veborg (died c. 750 CE), legendary shield-maiden known for her role in the Battle of Bråvalla

== See also ==
- Anglo-Scandinavian
- Danes (Germanic tribe)
- Geats
- Goths
- Gotlander
- Haplogroup I-M253
- Norse-Gaels
- Swedes (Germanic tribe)
