= Uppland Runic Inscription 699 =

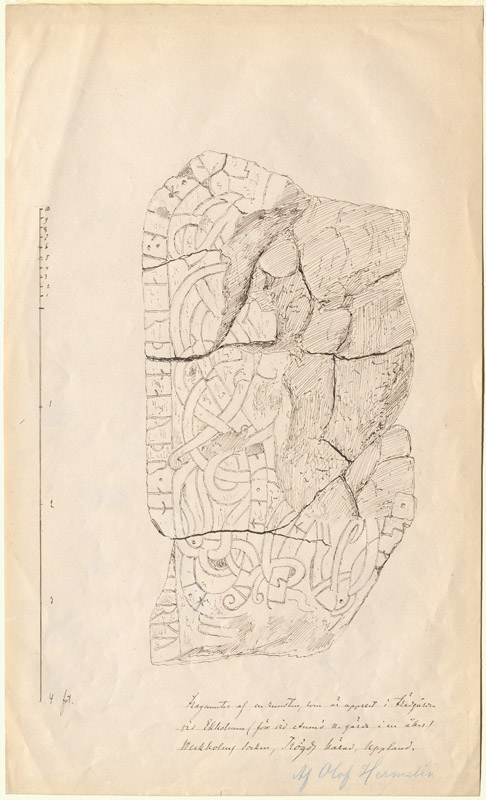
U 699.

The Uppland Runic Inscription 699 is a Viking Age runestone engraved in Old Norse with the Younger Futhark runic alphabet. It is located at Amnö, in Enköping Municipality. The style is Pr3, and it was made by the runemaster Balli.

== Inscription ==
[ikilaif · let · r]as[a · st-- at · bruna · boanta ·] s[in] · h(a)n : (u)arþ [·] tauþr · a t[an](m)(a)rku {· ¶ ·} i huita·uaþum [· bal]i {· ¶ ·} [-r]ist...
Ingilæif {} let {} ræisa {} st[æin] at {} Bruna, {} boanda {} sinn. {} Hann {} varð {} dauðr {} a Danmarku {} i hvitavaðum. {} Balli {} rist[i].
"Ingileif had the stone raised in memory of Brúni, her husbandman. He died in christening robes in Denmark. Balli carved."

== See also ==
- List of runestones
