= Lingsberg Runestones =

11th-century runestones in Sweden

Coordinates: 59°32′56″N 18°08′12″E

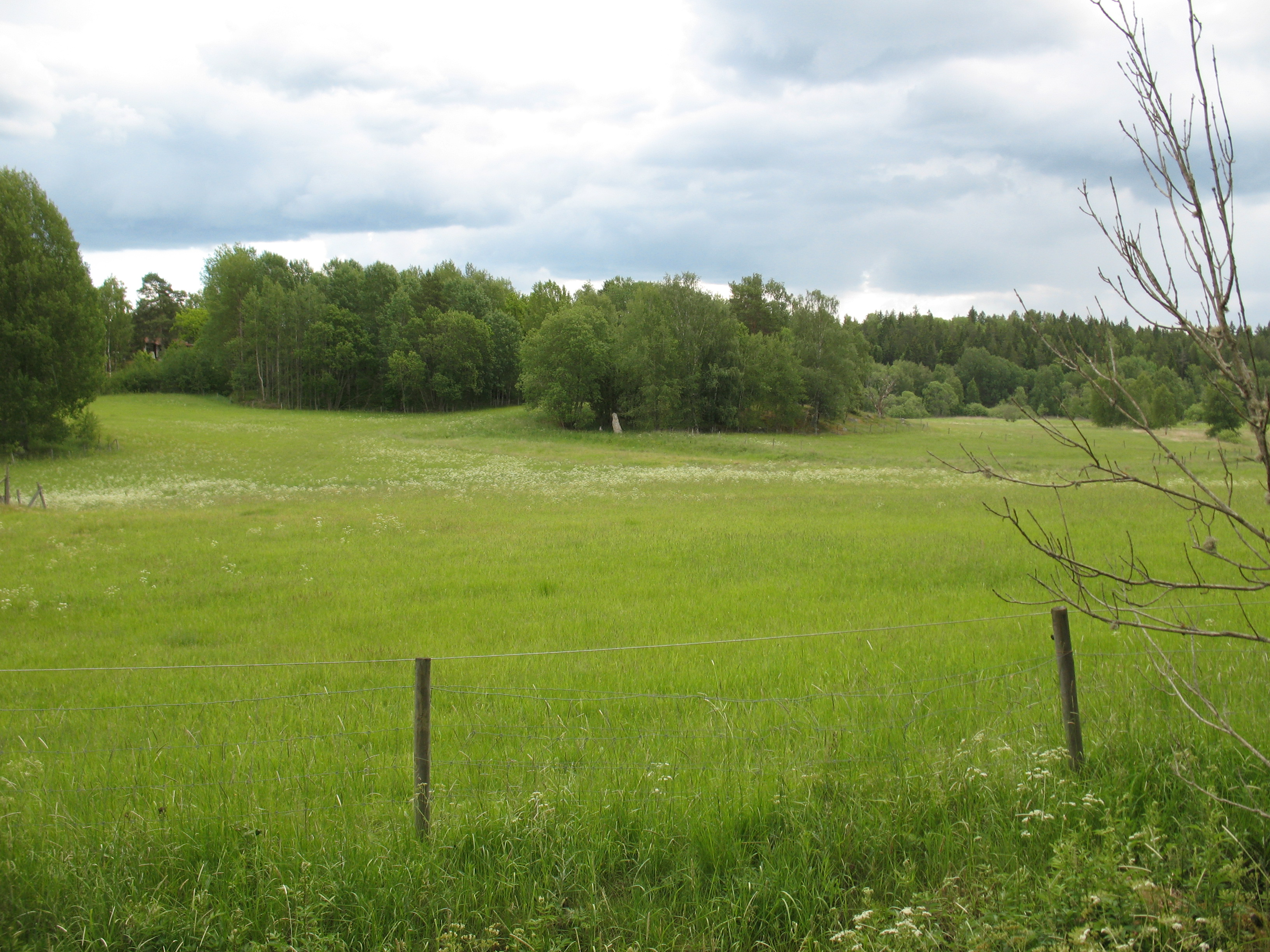
A meadow at Lingsberg. U 240 can be seen in the centre of the picture. It used to form a twin monument with U 241 before it was moved.

The Lingsberg Runestones are two 11th-century runestones, listed as U 240 and U 241 in the Rundata catalog, and one fragment, U 242, that are engraved in Old Norse using the younger futhark. They are at the Lingsberg farm about 2 kilometres (1.2 mi) east of Vallentuna (halfway to Kusta), which is about 24 kilometres (15 mi) north of the center of Stockholm, Stockholm County, Sweden, which was part of the former province of Uppland.

The two intact runestones were raised by members of the same family, and on U 241 they engraved for posterity that a grandfather had taken two Danegelds in England. Because the receipt of the Danegeld (tax) indicates likely service with the Scandinavian troops in the Thingmen from 1018 to 1066, the runestones are dated to the second quarter of the 11th century.

== U 240 ==
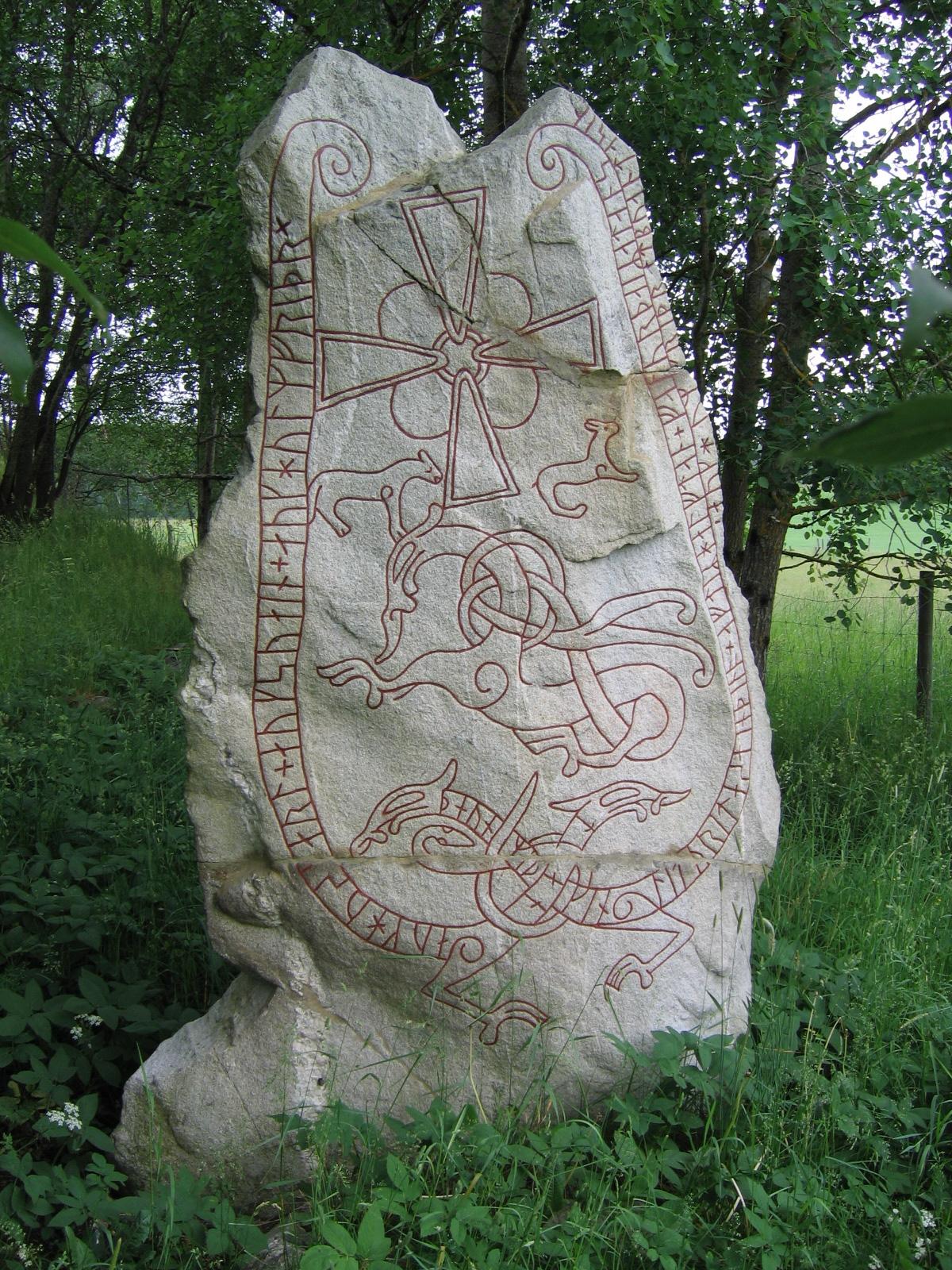
The runestone U 240.

The U 240 runestone is known locally as the Lingsbergsstenen 1 and was raised at the end of a causeway facing U 241. The causeway is only seen as traces in a field, and U 240 is the only runestone present. The area was much more marshy in the past and difficult to traverse until the water level in a local lake, Angarn, in Angarnsjöängen Nature Reserve was lowered in the 19th century. The inscription consists of runic text on two serpents or lindworms that bracket a Christian cross and some beasts. The final portion of the text that translates as "and Holmfríðr in memory of her husbandman" is carved on the outside of the serpent to the right. U 240 is classified as being carved in runestone style Pr3, which is also known as Urnes style, and is considered to be a good example of an inscription in style Pr3. This runestone style is characterized by slim and stylized animals that are interwoven into tight patterns. The animal heads are typically seen in profile with slender almond-shaped eyes and upwardly curled appendages on the noses and the necks. The runic text on U 240 was intended to be read together with that on U 241 to form a unified message. Based on stylistic analysis, the inscription has been attributed to the runemaster Åsmund, who was active in the first part of the 11th century.

tan auk hus(k)arl + auk suain + auk hulmfriþr × þaun (m)(i)(þ)kin litu rita stin þino × aftiʀ halftan + fa(þ)ur þaiʀa tans ' auk hum(f)riþr at buanta sin
Danr ok Húskarl {} ok Sveinn {} ok Holmfríðr, {} þau mœðgin létu rétta stein þenna {} eptir Halfdan, {} fǫður þeira Dans, {} ok Holmfríðr at bónda sinn.
Dan ok Huskarl {} ok Svæinn {} ok Holmfriðr, {} þaun møðgin letu retta stæin þenna {} æftiʀ Halfdan, {} faður þæiʀa Dans, {} ok Holmfriðr at boanda sinn.
Danr and Húskarl and Sveinn and Holmfríðr, the mother and (her) sons, had this stone erected in memory of Halfdan, the father of Danr and his brothers; and Holmfríðr in memory of her husbandman.

== U 241 ==
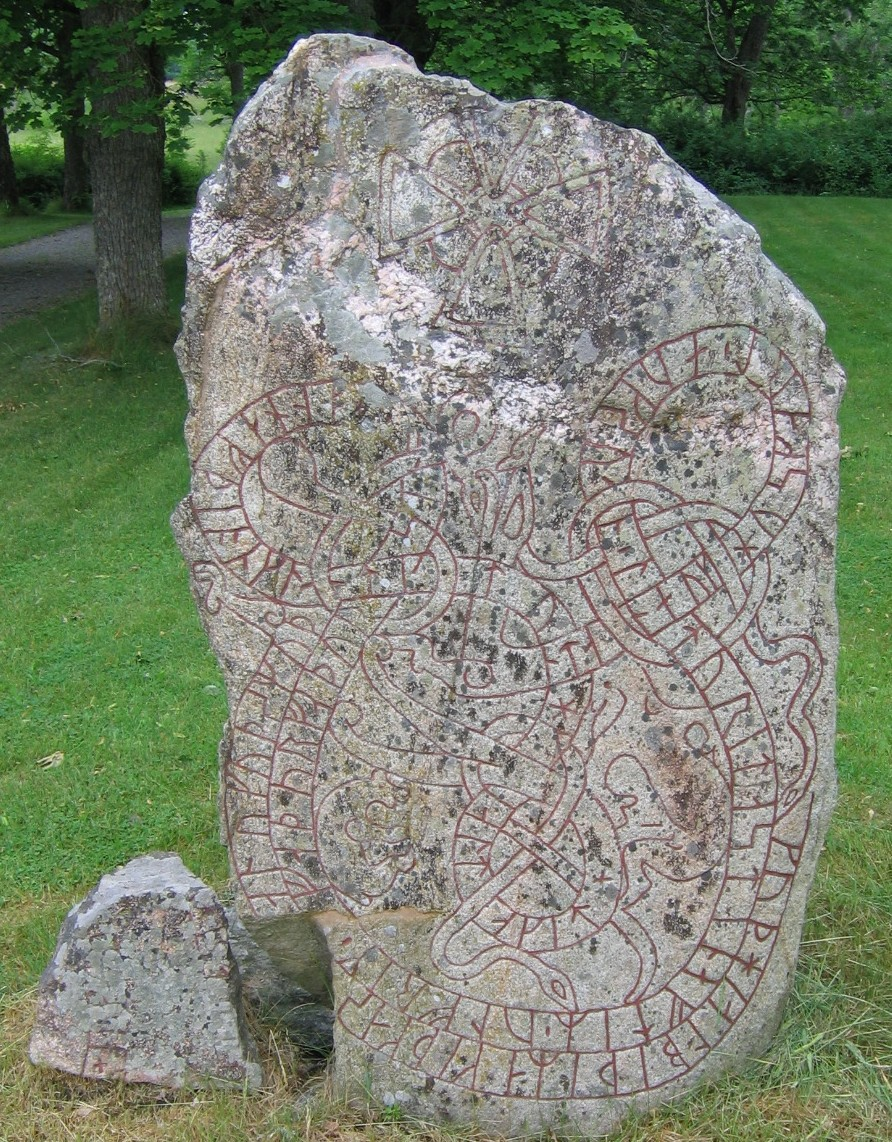
The runestone U 241 with U 242 at its bottom left.

The U 241 runestone, known locally as the Lingsbergsstenen 2, was originally at the end of a causeway facing U 240. It was discovered in 1909 during the plowing of a field. It has been moved and is in the courtyard of the main building of Lingsberg. The inscription consists of runic text carved on an intertwined serpent that is under a cross. Similar to U 240, U 241 is classified as being carved in runestone style Pr3 and is attributed to the runemaster Åsmund.

The runic text mentions Húskarl and Sveinn like U 241, except for Holmfríðr, and it adds Halfdan's father Ulfríkr, who had taken two danegelds in England. It does not mention which leaders paid the danegelds, unlike the other two runestones in Uppland that talk of danegelds, U 344 and U 194. The runic texts of U 240 and U 241 were intended to be read together to form a unified message, with the text on U 241 beginning with the Old Norse word en meaning "and."

It was common to only carve a single rune for two consecutive letters, even when the letters were at the end of one word and the beginning of a second word. When the text shown as Latin characters, the transliterated runes are doubled and separate words are shown. U 241 has three examples in its runic text where this occurred. The runes onklanti are transliterated as o| |onklanti, kialtakit as kialt| |takit, and salukuþs as salu| |uk| |kuþs. The Norse word salu for soul in the prayer at the end of the inscription was imported from English and was first recorded during the tenth century.

n tan auk huskarl ' auk sua(i)n ' l(i)tu rita stin aftiʀ ' ulfrik ' faþurfaþur sino ' hon hafþi o| |onklanti tuh kialt| |takit + kuþ hialbi þiʀa kiþka salu| |uk| |kuþs muþ(i)
En Danr ok Húskarl {} ok Sveinn {} létu rétta stein eptir {} Ulfrík, {} fǫðurfǫður sinn. {} Hann hafði á Englandi tvau gjald tekit. {} Guð hjalpi þeira feðga sálu ok Guðs móðir.
En Dan ok Huskarl {} ok Svæinn {} letu retta stæin æftiʀ {} Ulfrik, {} faðurfaður sinn. {} Hann hafði a Ænglandi tu giald takit. {} Guð hialpi þæiʀa fæðga salu ok Guðs moðiʀ.
And Danr and Húskarl and Sveinn had the stone erected in memory of Ulfríkr, their father's father. He had taken two payments in England. May God and God's mother help the souls of the father and son.

== U 242 ==
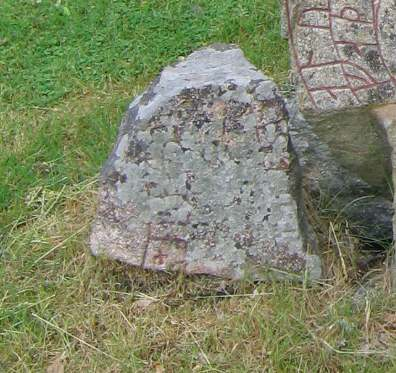
The runestone fragment U 242.

The U 242 runestone has been found as only a fragment. It is lying beside U 241 at the drive of the main building of Lingsberg.

…- × auk × st[u]… … …- × (r)(a)(i)(s)(a) × …
… {} ok {} … … … {} reisa {} …
… {} ok {} … … … {} ræisa {} …
… and … raise …

== See also ==
- List of runestones

== Sources ==
- Sveriges runinskrifter (1922) by Erik Brate
- Christer Hamp's page on runestones.
