= Vs 24 =

Vs 24 may refer to:

- Odendisa Runestone, a runestone with Rundata ID Vs24
- VS-24, a squadron of the United States Navy
