= Angarn =

Coordinates: 59°32′N 18°10′E

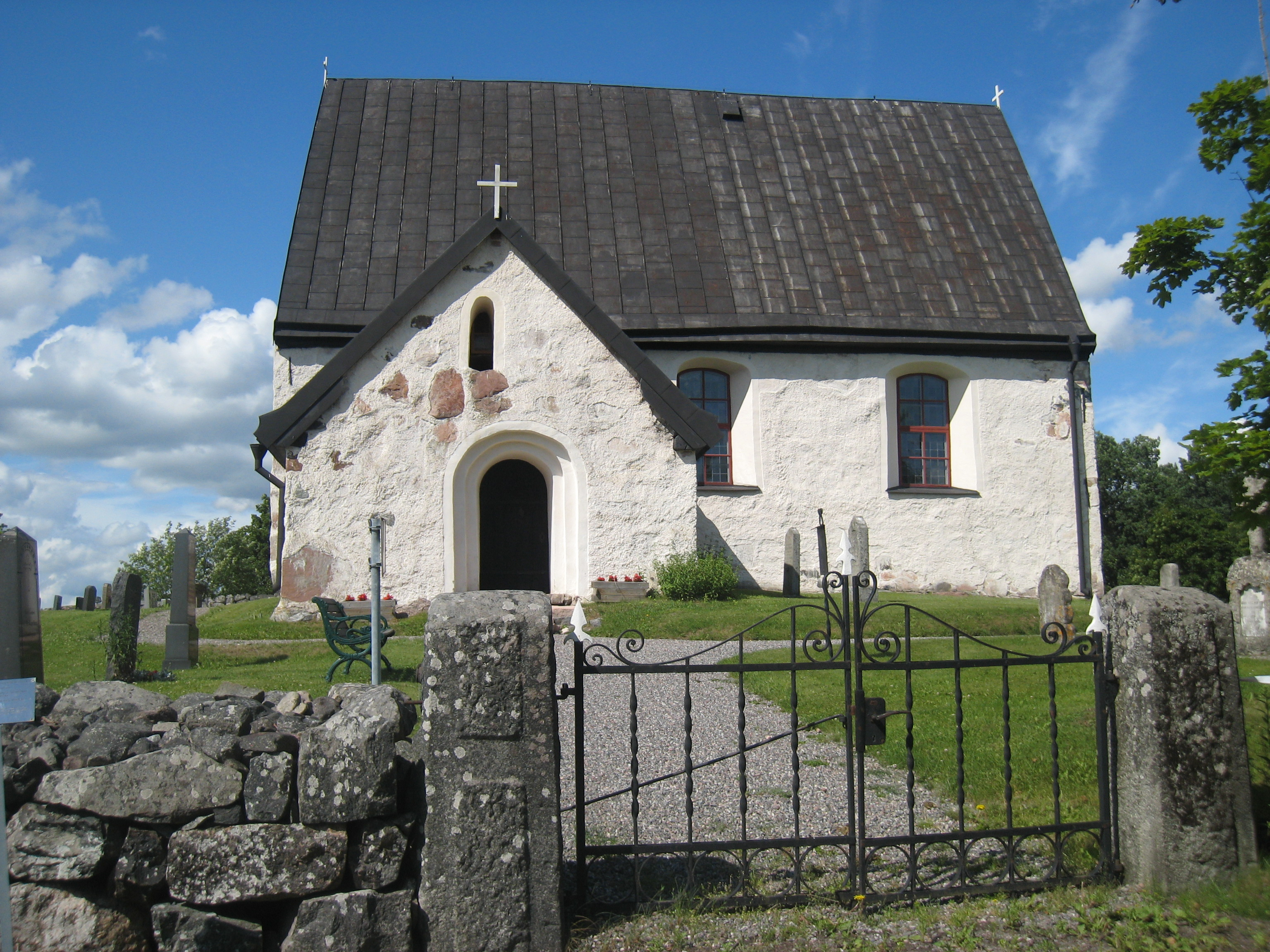
Village Church, Angarn, Sweden

Angarn (Swedish pronunciation: [ˈâŋːɡɑːɳ]) is a former ward in Vallentuna Municipality, Uppland (Stockholm). Since 2006, Angarn has been part of Össeby congregation.

In Angarn there are about 450 ancient monuments: cairns and stone circles of Bronze Age type, a remarkable rock carving, burial ground from the older and younger Iron Age and 10 rune stones.

The rectangular granite Angarn Church was probably built at the end of the 13th century.

The name ("Angarnæ", 1333) is a composition of an ("received") and garn ("elongated formation"), here referring to Angarnsjöängen, formerly a bay against Garnviken (formerly Garn).
