= Uppland Runic Inscription 705 =

Coordinates: 59.5409°N 17.3543°E

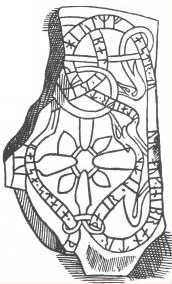
- Created: 11th Century
- Discovered: Mobacka, Uppland, Sweden
- Rundata ID: U 705
- Runemaster: Balle

Text – Native
- Old Norse : Olæifʀ ok Holmfastr/Hialmfastr o[k] ... ok Ænnibrantr þæiʀ letu ræisa stæin ... ... Balli ri[sti].

Translation
- Óleifr and Holmfastr/Hjalmfastr and ... and Ennibrattr, they had the stone raised ... ... Balli carved.

This runestone, designated as U 705 in the Rundata catalog, is located at Mobacka in Uppland, Sweden.

== Description ==
This runestone was depicted by Johan Hadorph during the 17th century. The stone later disappeared, but was recovered in 1926 when it was discovered that it had been used as a miller's stone. Many runestones were used as building materials for buildings, roads, bridges, and other uses before their historic significance was understood.

The runestone is signed by the runemaster Balle, who was active in Sweden in the second half of the 11th century. It is classified as being carved in runestone style Pr3, also known as the Urnes style. This runestone style is characterized by slim and stylized animals that are interwoven into tight patterns. The animal heads are typically seen in profile with slender almond-shaped eyes and upwardly curled appendages on the noses and the necks.

== Inscription ==
A transliteration of the runic inscription into roman letters is:

[* ulaifr * tuk hiulmfastr * au... ...u- auk] * (e)(n)[ibrantr] * þair * litu * [raisa * s](t)ain * [þ... ...ui-... bali * ri...]

== See also ==
- List of runestones
