= Hälsingland Rune Inscription 21 =

- Created: 11th Century
- Discovered: Nordanstig, Hälsingland, Sweden
- Rundata ID: Hs 21
- Runemaster: Gunnborga

The Hälsingland Runic Inscription 21 is a Viking Age memorial runestone cataloged as Hs 21 under Rundata, located in Jättendal, Nordanstig Municipality, Hälsingland, Sweden. It is notable for being crafted by a female runemaster (or runemistress), so far the only byspell of such kind.

== Description ==
This runestone consists of runish text carved within a band that curves along the stone. The granite runestone, which is two meters in height, is classified as being carved in a runestone style known as RAK. The inscription states that the runemistress, Gunnborga, "painted" the runes. She is the only known female runecarver during this time period in Scandinavia. The runish text uses the word fahido, "painted", also translated as "carved" or "inscribed." Although many runestones had their inscriptions painted, there is no direct evidence that this particular runestone was painted.

Of the personal names in the inscription, Ásmundr means "Godlyhand", with Ás or áss ("god") being the singular of Æsir; Farthegn means either "Far-Faring Thegn" or "Far-Faring Warrior"; and the personal name Þorketil (Thorketill, literally "Thorkettle"), which is a theophoric name revering the Norse god Thor, means "Thor's Vessel", possibly referring to divine possession or to a type of sacrificial cauldron—the Poetic Edda poem Hymiskviða, for byspell, includes a story of Thor fetching a large cauldron to brew ale.

== Inscription ==
Reading
A reading of the Hs 21 runestone's text in Old East Norse.

asmuntr · ok fa[r]þ[i]k[l] · þiʀ ritu stin · þina · aftiʀ þu[rkatil · faþur sin · a utrunkum · k]unburka faþ[i stin þina in kuþa]
Ásmundr {} ok Farþegn, {} þeir réttu stein {} þenna {} eptir Þorketil, {} fǫður sinn, {} á Vatrungum. {} Gunnborga fáði stein þenna, hin góða.
Ásmundr and Farþegn, they erected this stone in memory of Þorketill of Vattrång, their father. Gunnborga the good coloured this stone.

== See also ==
- List of runestones
