= John Sundberg =

Swedish sport shooter

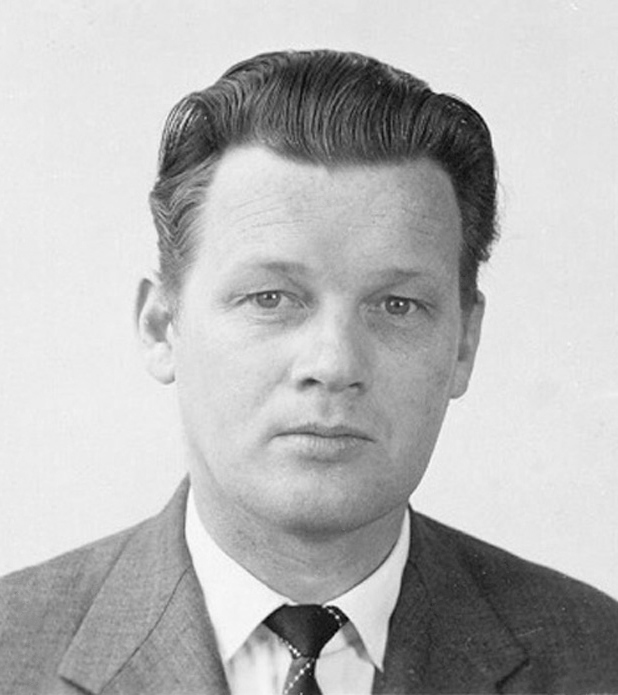

Personal information
- Born: 20 December 1920 Gävle, Sweden
- Died: 10 February 2004 (aged 83) Jättendal, Sweden
- Height: 177 cm (5 ft 10 in)
- Weight: 74 kg (163 lb)

Sport
- Sport: Sports shooting
- Event: Rifle
- Club: Södermalm Liljeholmens Skf, Stockholm
Medal record
Representing Sweden
Olympic Games
Bronze medal – third place	1956 Melbourne	50 m rifle, 3 positions

John Sundberg (20 December 1920 – 10 February 2004) was a Swedish sport shooter. He competed in various rifle events at the 1956 and 1964 Summer Olympics and won a bronze medal in 50 metre rifle three positions in 1956. Sundberg won several medals at the world championships of 1954–1955, in the 50 and 300 m distances, kneeling and lying positions, individual and with the Swedish team.
