= Þorbjörg =

Þorbjörg is an Icelandic feminine given name. Notable people with the name include:

- Þorbjörg Sigríður Gunnlaugsdóttir (born 1978), Icelandic politician
- Þorbjörg lítilvölva ('c. 10th century CE), seeress in Norse colonial Greenland
- Þorbjörg Pálsdóttir (1919–2009), Icelandic sculptor
- Þorbjörg Sveinsdóttir (1827–1903), Icelandic midwife and feminist
- Margrét Þorbjörg Thors Hallgrímsson (1902–1996), matriarch of one of the most powerful families in Iceland
