= Uppland Runic Inscription 873 =

Coordinates: 59.7435°N 17.2829°E

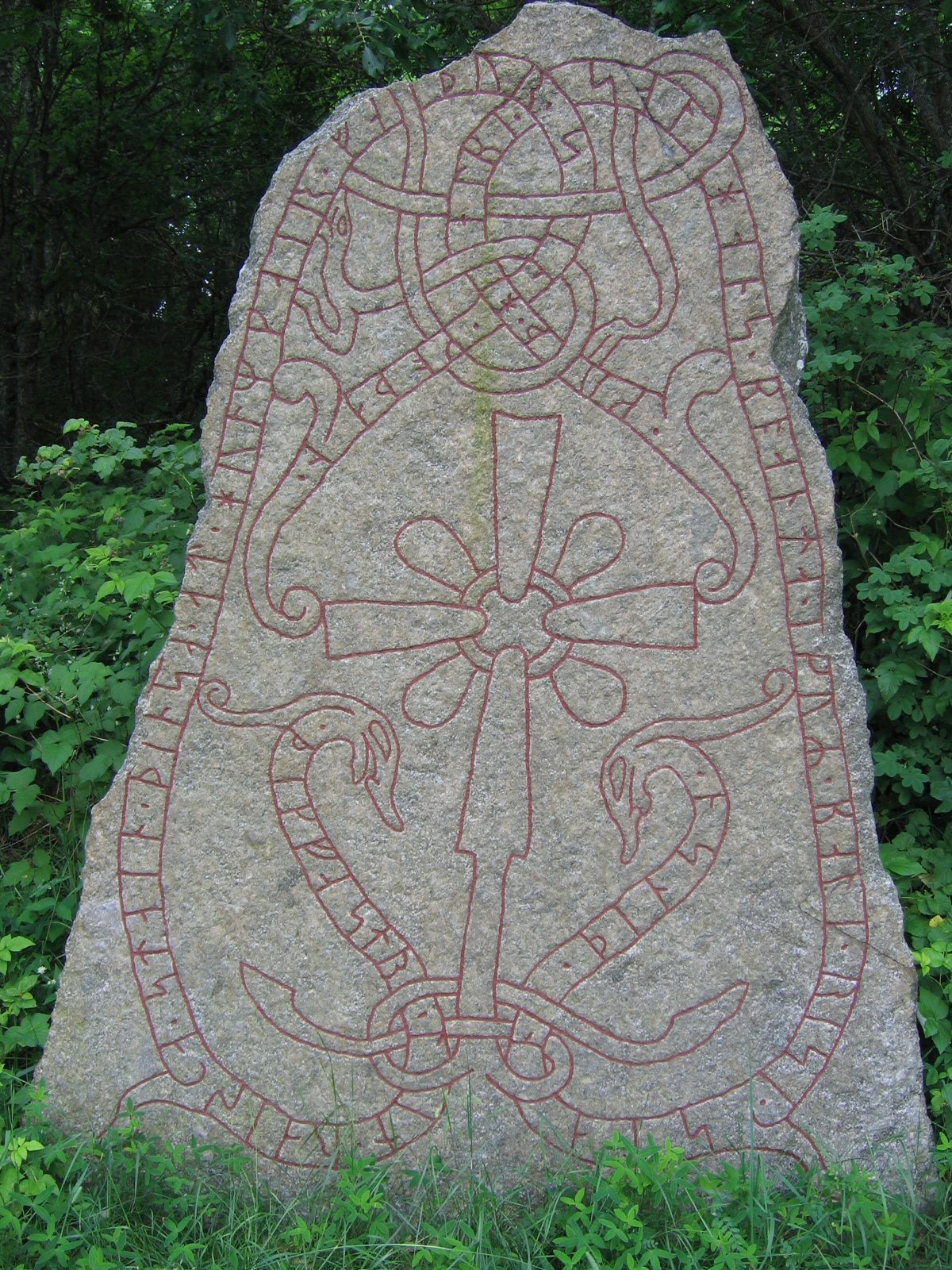
Runestone U 873 is located in Örsunda, Uppland, Sweden.

Runic inscription U 873 is the Rundata catalog number for a Viking Age memorial runestone that is located in Örsunda, which is about one kilometer west of Örsundsbro, Uppsala County, Sweden, which is in the historic province of Uppland.

== Description ==
The inscription on this runestone consists of runic text on two intertwining serpents that surround a Christian cross. The inscription is tentatively classified as being carved in runestone style Pr3, which is also known as Urnes style. This runestone style is characterized by slim and stylized animals that are interwoven into tight patterns. The animal heads are typically seen in profile with slender almond-shaped eyes and upwardly curled appendages on the noses and the necks. This inscription is signed by the runemaster Balle, who was active in western Uppland, Västmanland, and northern Södermanland in the second half of the eleventh century. The runes for Balle's name, bali, are carved on the serpent in the lower right portion of this inscription. Balle was noted for the consistency of his use of a dot as a punctuation mark between the words of his runic inscriptions, and this usage is evident in this inscription.

The runic text states that the stone is a memorial raised by Þingfastr to his father Holmgeirr, who is described as being the husband of Inga. By referring to her in this manner, the text is probably indicating that she was also deceased when the stone was raised. Consistent with the cross on the stone identifying it as a Christian memorial, the text includes a prayer for Holmgeirr's sál, or soul, a word which was not used in Old Norse until after the introduction of Christianity.

== Inscription ==
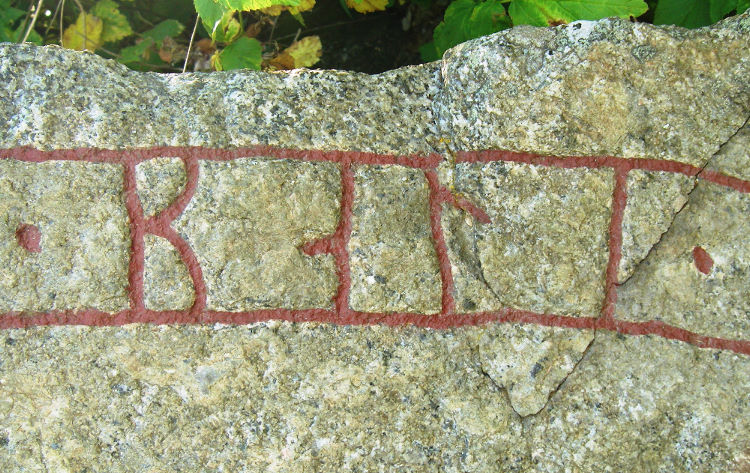
The signature of Balle on U 873.

=== Transliteration of the runes into Latin characters ===
* þikfastr * lit * raisa * stain * þinsa * at * hulmkair * faþur * sin * koþan ** kuþ * hielbi * sal hans * boanta * ikuʀ * bali * risi * stan * þinsa *

=== Transcription into Old Norse ===
Þingfastr let ræisa stæin þennsa at Holmgæiʀ, faður sinn goðan, Guð hialpi sal hans, boanda Inguʀ. Balli risti stæin þennsa.

=== Translation in English ===
Þingfastr had this stone raised in memory of Holmgeirr, his good father, Inga's husbandman. May God help his soul. Balli carved this stone.

== See also ==
- List of runestones
