= Angarn Church =

Lutheran church in Stockholm County, Sweden

Coordinates: 59°32′12″N 18°10′07″E

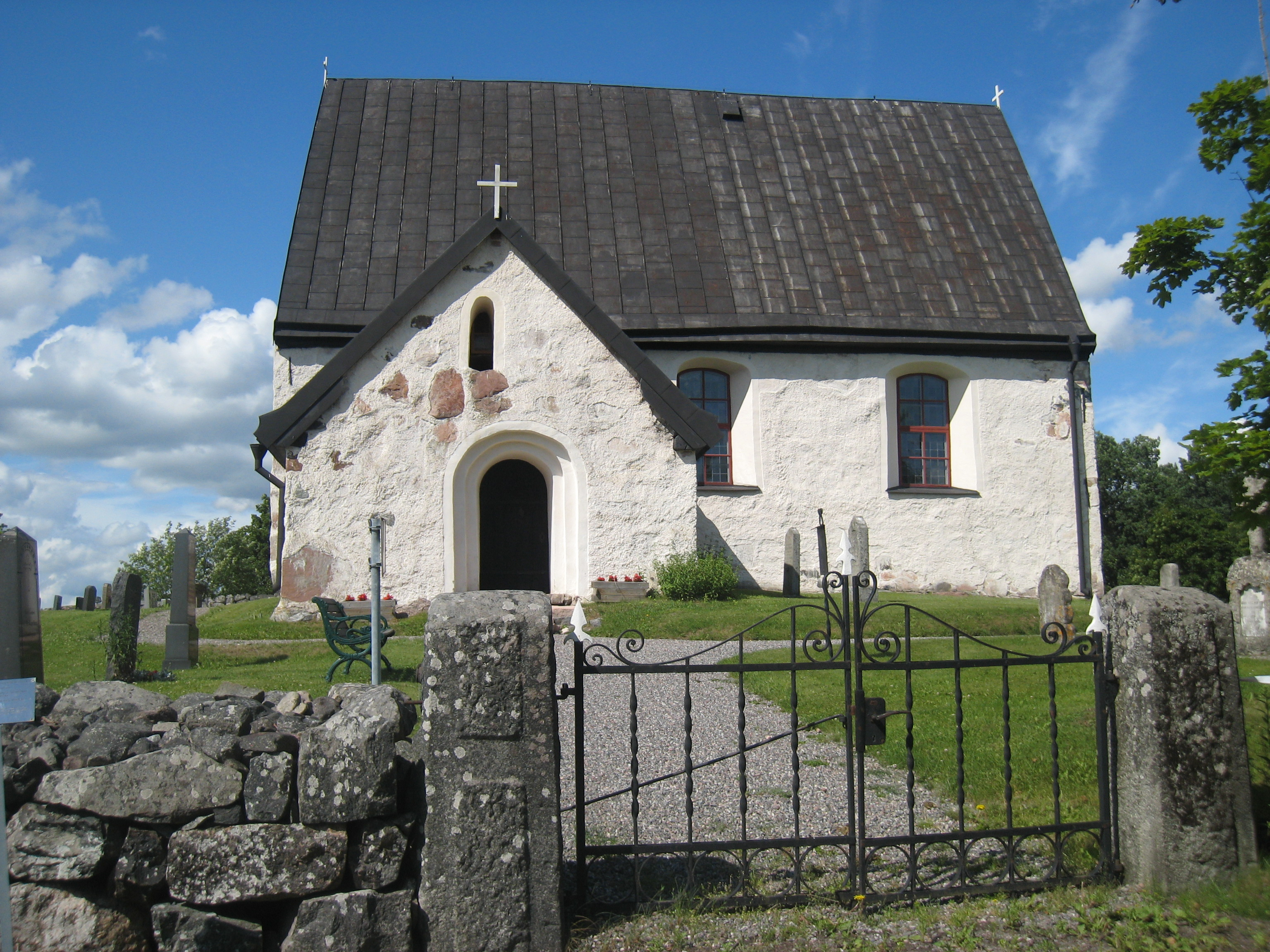
Angarn Church, external view

Angarn Church (Swedish: Angarns kyrka) is a Lutheran church at Angarn in Vallentuna Municipality, Stockholm County, Sweden. It is located close to Angarnsjöängen nature reserve. The church is associated with the Archdiocese of Uppsala of the Church of Sweden.

== History ==
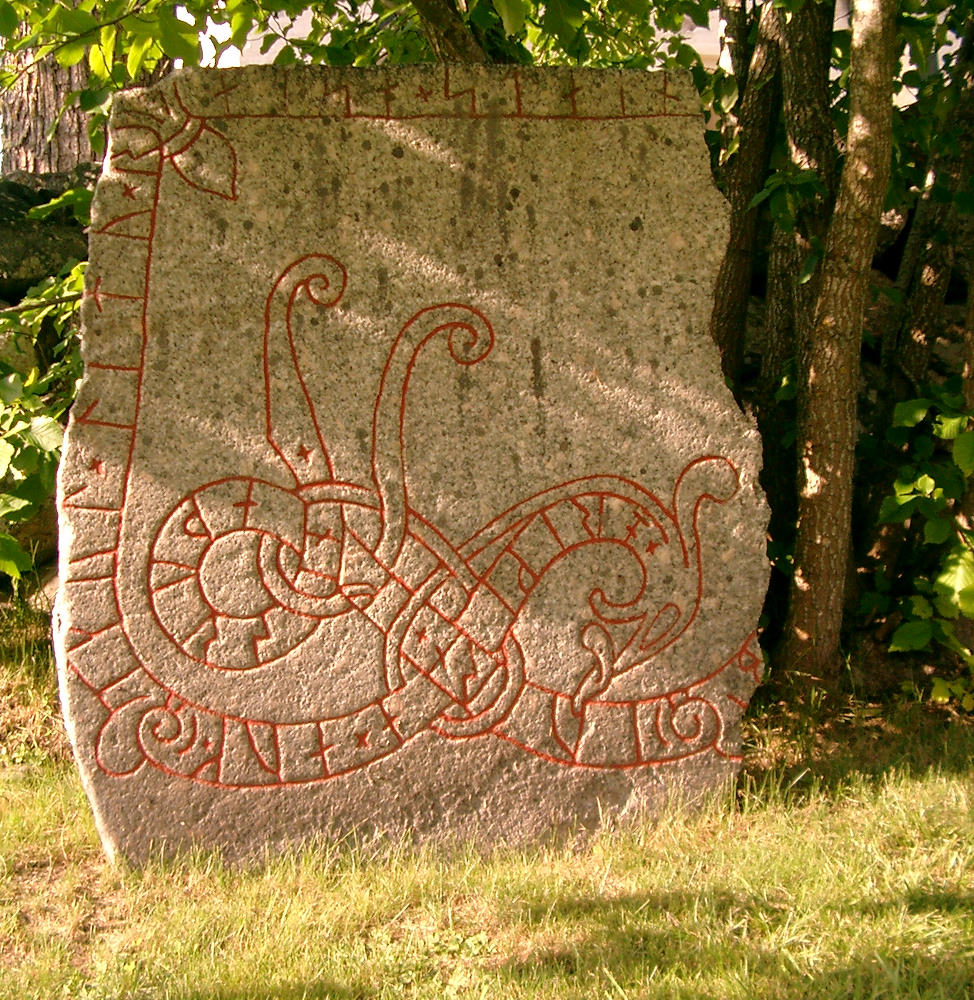
One of the runestones next to the church

Although Angarn Church probably dates from the 1280s, it lies in a cultural landscape with a much older history. Petroglyphs from the Bronze Age, as well as several significantly later runestones testify to the old traditions of the place. The church was built on a hill next to an inlet of the Baltic Sea (which has subsequently disappeared as a consequence of post-glacial rebound) and thus was strategically located, easy to reach by boat.

The church lies in an enclosed cemetery. On the grounds there are several runestones, and one (U 201 in Rundata) is also immured in the church. Of the runestones on the church grounds, one (U 203 in Rundata) was possibly made by the only known female runemaster, Frögärd i Ösby.

== Architecture ==
The exterior of the church is plain, whitewashed fieldstone, with a few details in brick. The form is a hall church, and it may be one of the oldest hall churches in Uppland. The church door is probably the original, medieval door, although the lock mechanism dates from the 18th century.

The interior of the church is dominated by the barrel vaulted ceiling, a construction carried out during a major renovation of the church in 1795-96. Much of the rest of the interior of the church is also characterised by the architectural ideals of the late 18th century.

Among the furnishings are the 13th century baptismal font made on Gotland and the Romanesque triumphal cross dating from the 12th century. The pulpit and altar are both from the late 18th century; the neoclassical pulpit was carved by the royal ornament sculptor Petter Ljung (1743-1819) and the pews are imitations of 18th century pews made in the 1940s. Among the rarest objects belonging to the church is a chasuble, dating from the 16th century. The organ was set up in the church in 1849, but is probably built around the year 1800.

The church has an external wooden bell tower constructed in 1661 containing two bells; the oldest probably from the early 14th century and the other dating from mid-18th century.
