= Gran (island) =

Island in Gävleborg, Sweden

Coordinates: 62°00′48″N 17°37′48″E

Gran is an island in Nordanstig Municipality, Gävleborg County, Sweden.

Gran has an area of about 0.63 km^{2}. It is about 10 km from the mainland. There are remains of an old fishing village. The island is included in a nature reserve established in 1988. The climate is lush and rich.
