= Bergsjö =

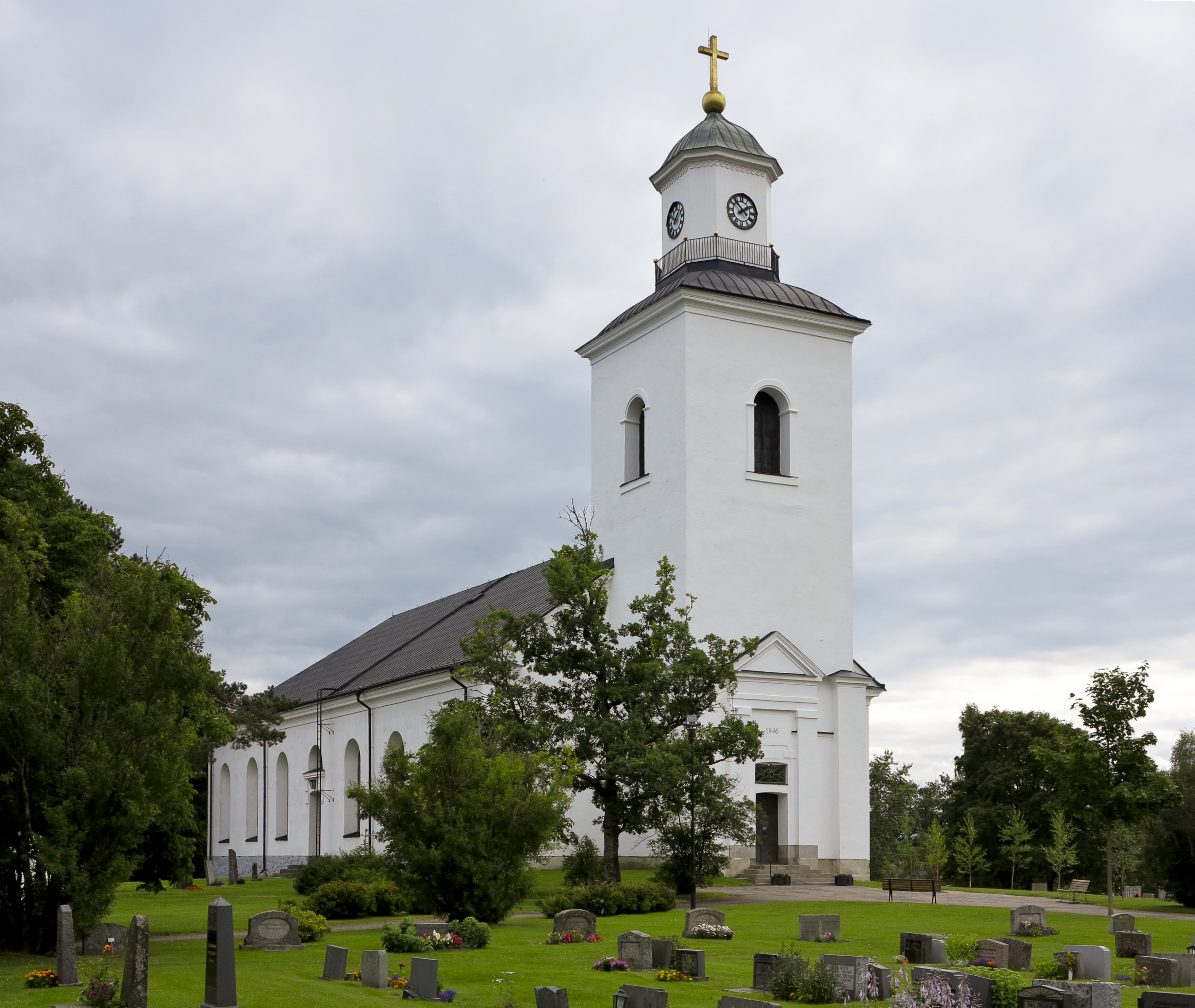
- Bergsjö Church in July 2012

- Location within Sweden Gävleborg Location within Sweden
- Coordinates: 61°59′N 17°04′E
- Country: Sweden
- Province: Hälsingland
- County: Gävleborg County
- Municipality: Nordanstig Municipality

Area
  - Total: 1.65 km^{2} (0.64 sq mi)

Population (31 December 2010)
  - Total: 1,266
  - Density: 766/km^{2} (1,980/sq mi)
- Time zone: UTC+1 (CET)
  - Summer (DST): UTC+2 (CEST)
- Climate: Dfc

Bergsjö is a locality and the seat of Nordanstig Municipality, Gävleborg County, Sweden with 1,266 inhabitants in 2010.
