= Harmånger =

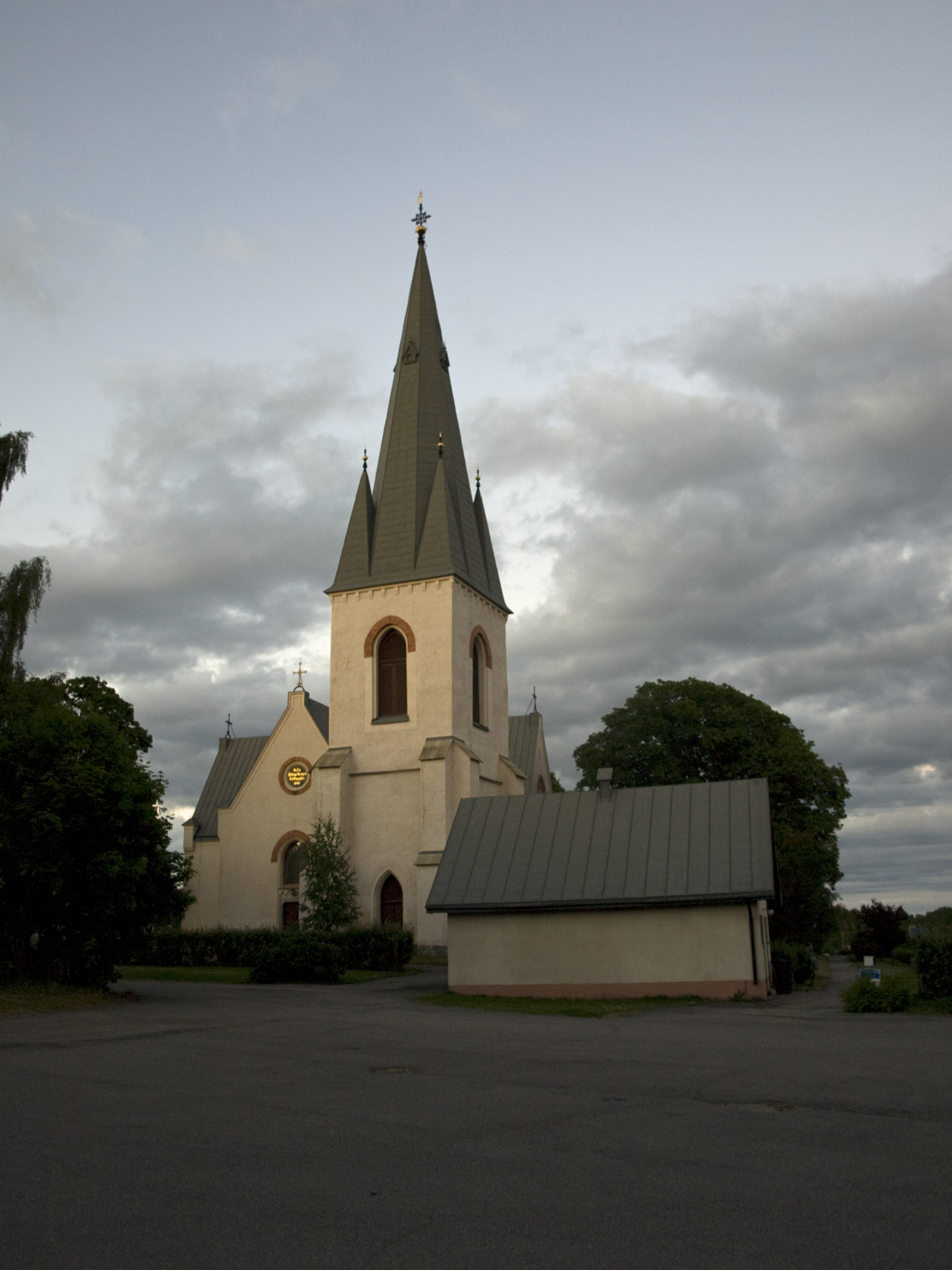
- Church in Harmånger

- Location within Sweden Gävleborg Location within Sweden
- Coordinates: 61°56′N 17°13′E
- Country: Sweden
- Province: Hälsingland
- County: Gävleborg County
- Municipality: Nordanstig Municipality

Area
  - Total: 0.91 km^{2} (0.35 sq mi)

Population (31 December 2010)
  - Total: 540
  - Density: 591/km^{2} (1,530/sq mi)
- Time zone: UTC+1 (CET)
  - Summer (DST): UTC+2 (CEST)
- Climate: Dfb

Harmånger is a locality situated in Nordanstig Municipality, Gävleborg County, Sweden, with 540 inhabitants in 2010.
