= Frögärd i Ösby =

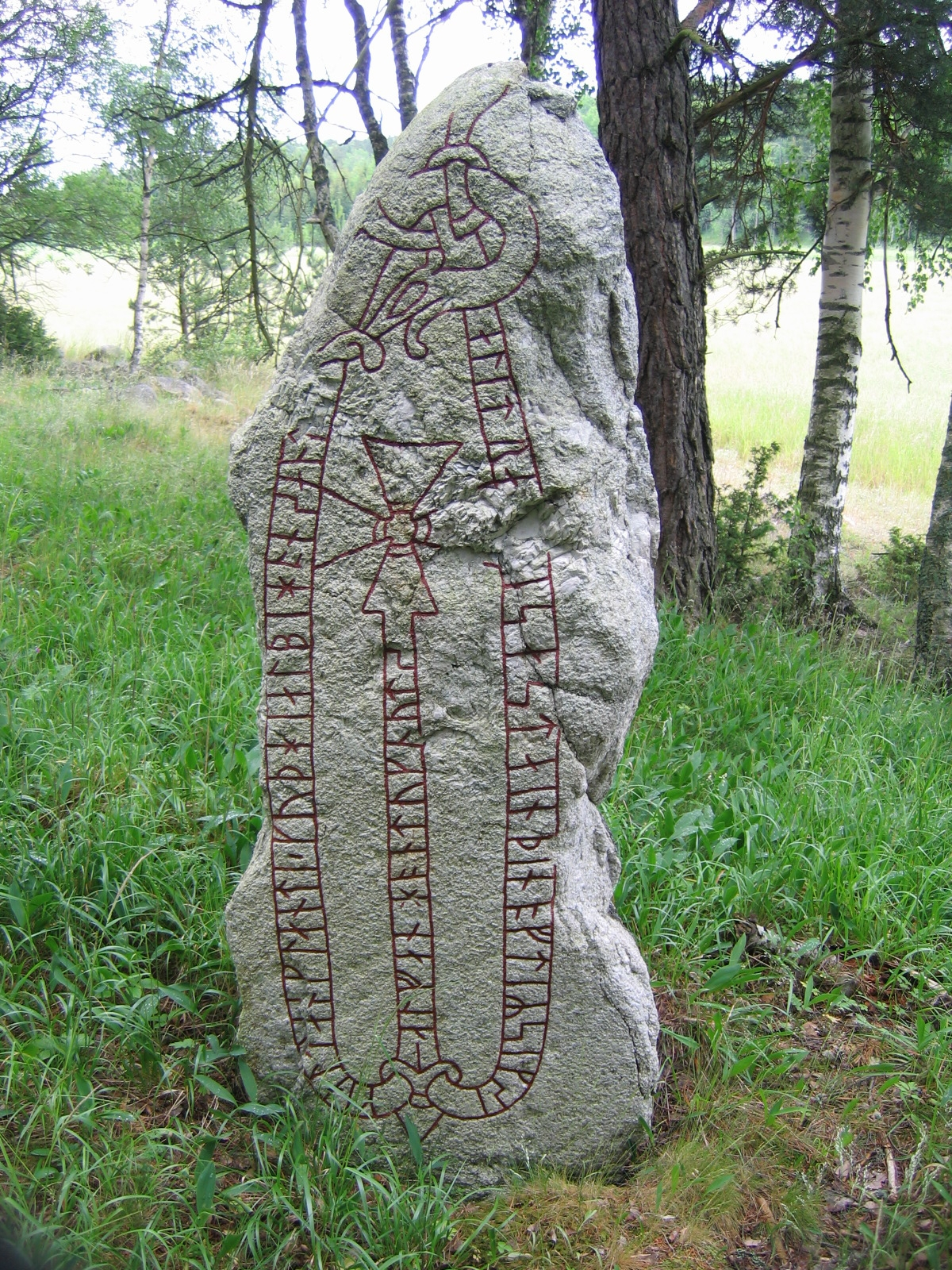
U 194 in Väsby has been erroneously attributed to Frögärd.

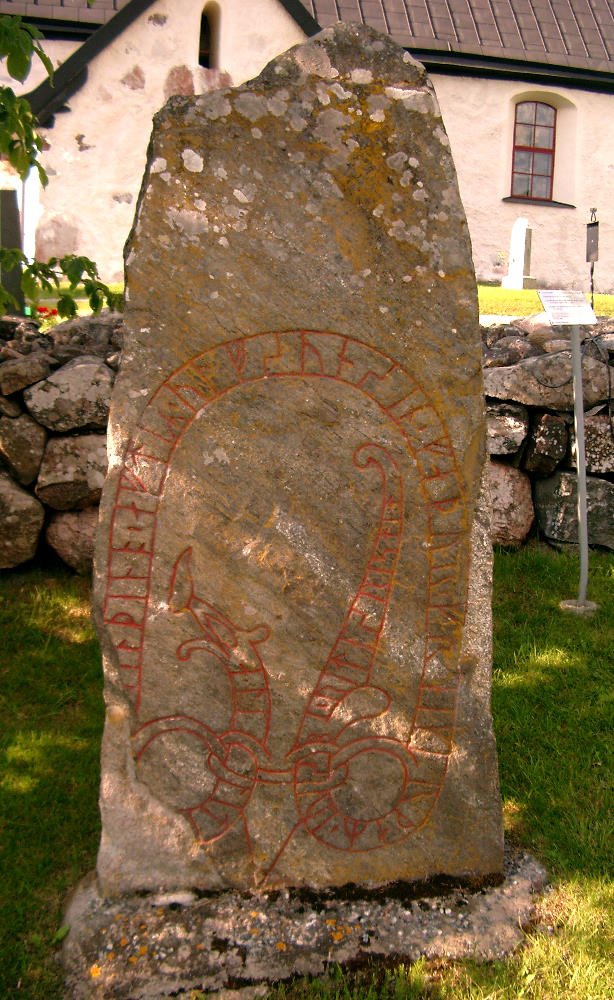
Uppland Runic Inscription U 203 beside Angarn Church in Uppland

Frögärd Ulvsdotter i Ösby (11th century) was a Swedish Norse woman. She was, according to a common misconception, believed to be a female Viking Age runemaster. This notion is based on Erik Brate's erroneous interpretation of runestone U 203. By 1943, Elias Wessén convincingly demonstrated that the sequence in question cannot be read as a carver's signature. Also, the rune that transliterates to uisby should be read Väsby (a location) rather than Ösby.

U 203 was raised by Ale (or Alle) in memory of his son Ulv, “father to Frögärd in Väsby”. Ale (Alle) is also responsible for runestone U 194, which he raised in memory of himself while he was still alive. According to this inscription, Ale (Alle) received a share of Canute the Great’s Danegeld in 1017. Thus, Frögärd was probably a member of a wealthy family and the only beneficiary of her father's and grandfather's inheritance. Birgit Sawyer suggests that Ale's (Alle's) purpose with U 203 could have been to take care of his underage granddaughter's inheritance.

Both U 194 and U 203 were likely carved by Åsmund Kåresson.

An actual Swedish Viking Age runemaster who was a woman was Gunnborga.
