= Strömsbruk =

- Location within Sweden Gävleborg Location within Sweden
- Coordinates: 61°52′N 17°19′E
- Country: Sweden
- Province: Hälsingland
- County: Gävleborg County
- Municipality: Nordanstig Municipality

Area
  - Total: 0.94 km^{2} (0.36 sq mi)

Population (31 December 2010)
  - Total: 362
  - Density: 384/km^{2} (990/sq mi)
- Time zone: UTC+1 (CET)
  - Summer (DST): UTC+2 (CEST)
- Climate: Dfb

Strömsbruk is a locality situated in Nordanstig Municipality, Gävleborg County, Sweden with 362 inhabitants in 2010.
