= Odendisa Runestone =

Coordinates: 59.8731°N 16.3414°E

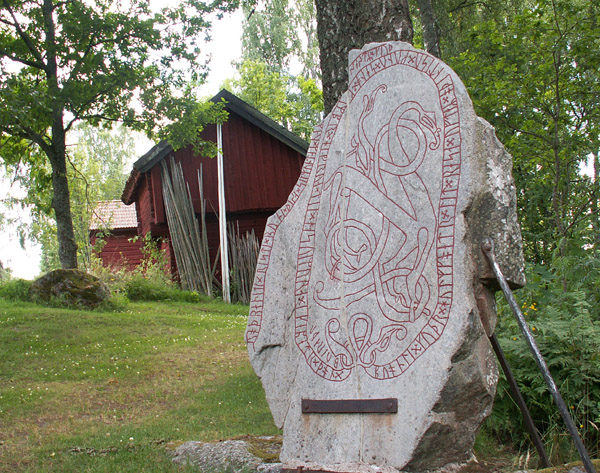
- Created: c. 1050
- Discovered: Fläckebo Parish, Västmanland, Sweden
- Rundata ID: Vs 24
- Runemaster: Red-Balli

The Odendisa Runestone (Swedish: Odendisastenen), sometimes called the Hassmyra Runestone, is a Viking Age runestone erected at Hassmyra, Västmanland, Sweden. It is exceptional in that it has a metric inscription, and that it commemorates a woman.

The stone was first described in the 1660s. According to tradition, a farmer discovered the runestone while he ploughed the field. A few years later it cracked in half. It was mended in 1900 and raised anew where it is now.

== Description ==
A reading of the Odendisa stone's text in Old East Norse.

The inscription is read as:

buonti × kuþr × hulmkoetr × lit × resa × ufteʀ × oþintisu × kunu × seno × kumbr × hifrya × til × hasuimura × iki betr × þon × byi raþr roþbalir × risti × runi × þisa × sikmuntaʀ × uaʀ ... sestʀ × kuþ
Boandi {} goðr {} Holmgautr {} let {} ræisa {} æftiʀ {} Oðindisu, {} kunu {} sina. {} Kumbʀ {} hifrøya {} til {} Hasvimyra {} æigi bætri, {} þan {} byi raðr. Rauð-Balliʀ {} risti {} runiʀ {} þessaʀ. {} Sigmundaʀ {} vaʀ [Oðindisa] systiʀ {} goð.
"The good husbandman Holmgautr had (the stone) raised in memory of Óðindísa, his wife. There will come to Hassmyra no better housewife, who arranges the estate. Red-Balli carved these runes. Óðindísa was a good sister to Sigmundr."

The runic text carved on the serpent of the Odendisa Runestone contains a poem in fornyrðislag and is one of few runestones raised for a woman, and the only one in Sweden with a verse commemorating a woman.

The metrical part is interpreted as:

Kumbʀ hifrøya / til Hasvimyra / æigi bætri / þan byi raðr
"To Hassmyra will come no better housewife, who arranges the estate."

The housewife is thus remembered as the one "arranging the estate", as was usual in medieval Scandinavian society.

The theophoric name Odendisa (Old Norse: Óðindísa), which means "Lady of Odin," is a unique name and is not known from any other source. In addition, the name of her husband is very rare.

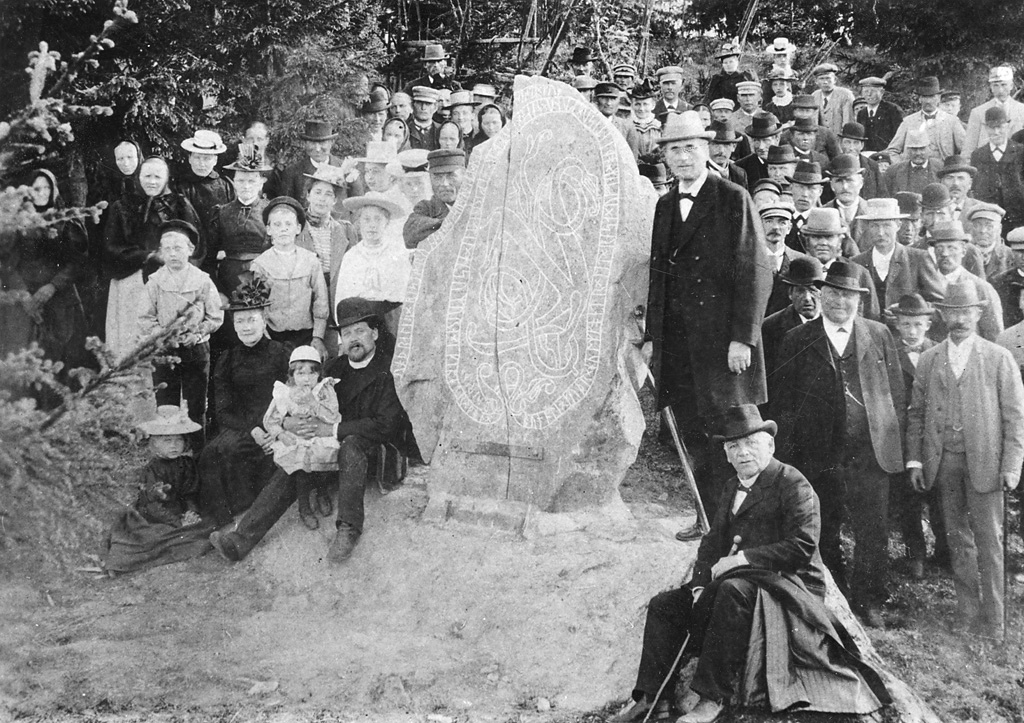
Raising of the runestone in 1910.

The Odendisa Runestone was carved by Red-Balli, a famous runemaster who was active in the region around lake Mälaren in the second half of the 11th century.

The name Red-Balli is indicated by the runes roþbalir, which is not part of the main text carved on the serpent but starts a separate outer text band at the lower left of the inscription. This stone is classified as being carved in runestone style Pr4, also known as the Urnes style. This runestone style is characterized by slim and stylized animals that are interwoven into tight patterns. The animal heads are typically seen in profile with slender almond-shaped eyes and upwardly curled appendages on the noses and the necks.

== See also ==
- List of runestones
