= Stocka =

- Location within Sweden Gävleborg Location within Sweden
- Coordinates: 61°54′N 17°20′E
- Country: Sweden
- Province: Hälsingland
- County: Gävleborg County
- Municipality: Nordanstig Municipality

Area
  - Total: 0.92 km^{2} (0.36 sq mi)

Population (31 December 2010)
  - Total: 382
  - Density: 417/km^{2} (1,080/sq mi)
- Time zone: UTC+1 (CET)
  - Summer (DST): UTC+2 (CEST)
- Climate: Dfb

Stocka is a locality in Nordanstig Municipality, Gävleborg County, Sweden with 382 inhabitants in 2010.
