= Jättendal =

- Location within Sweden Gävleborg Location within Sweden
- Coordinates: 61°58′N 17°15′E
- Country: Sweden
- Province: Hälsingland
- County: Gävleborg County
- Municipality: Nordanstig Municipality

Area
  - Total: 0.70 km^{2} (0.27 sq mi)

Population (31 December 2010)
  - Total: 253
  - Density: 362/km^{2} (940/sq mi)
- Time zone: UTC+1 (CET)
  - Summer (DST): UTC+2 (CEST)
- Climate: Dfc

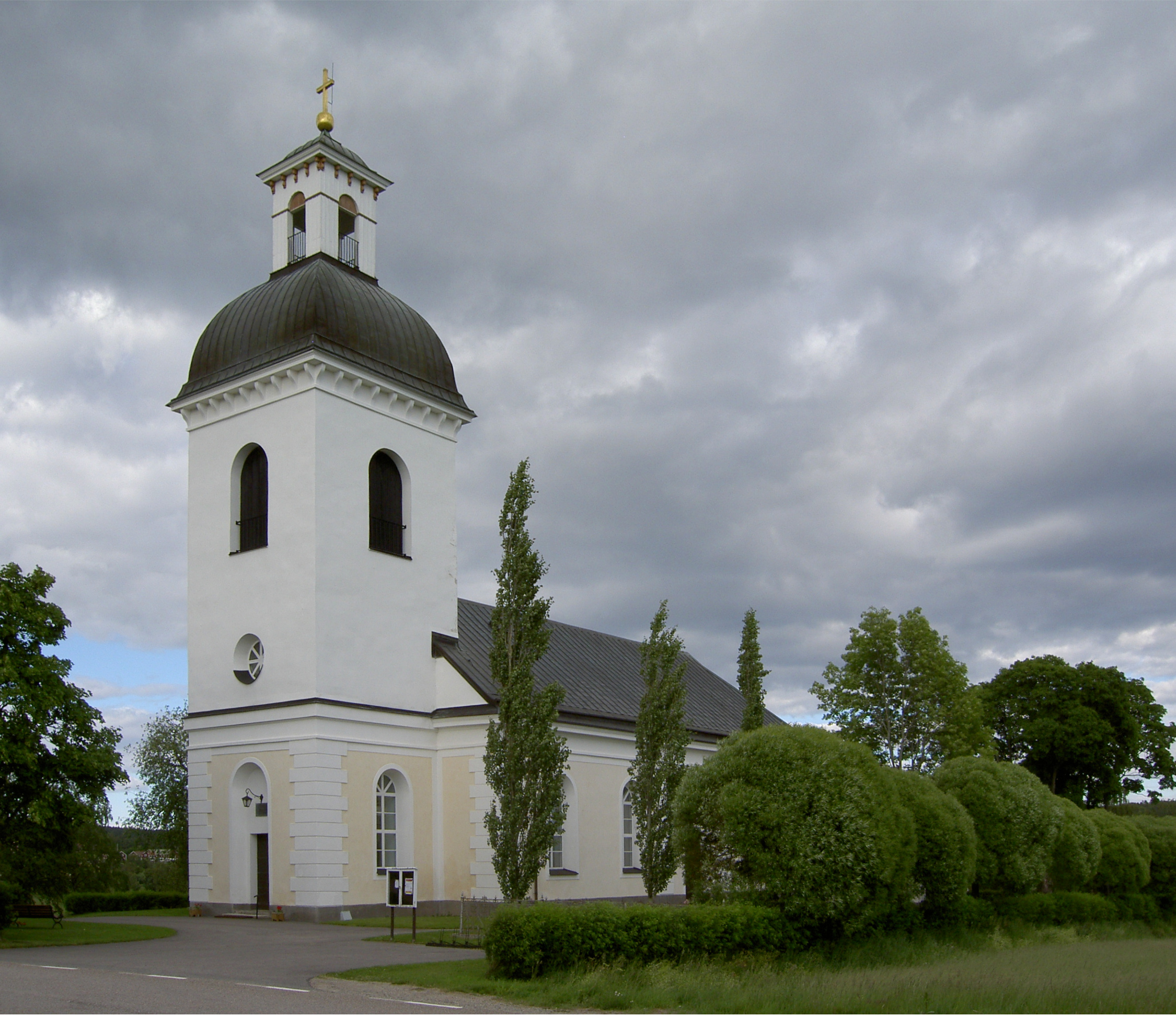
Jättendal Church

Jättendal is a locality situated in Nordanstig Municipality, Gävleborg County, Sweden with 253 inhabitants in 2010.

A runestone carved by a female runemaster, cataloged as HS 21 under Rundata, is located here.
