= Nordanstig Municipality =

Nordanstig Municipality Nordanstigs kommun
- Municipality
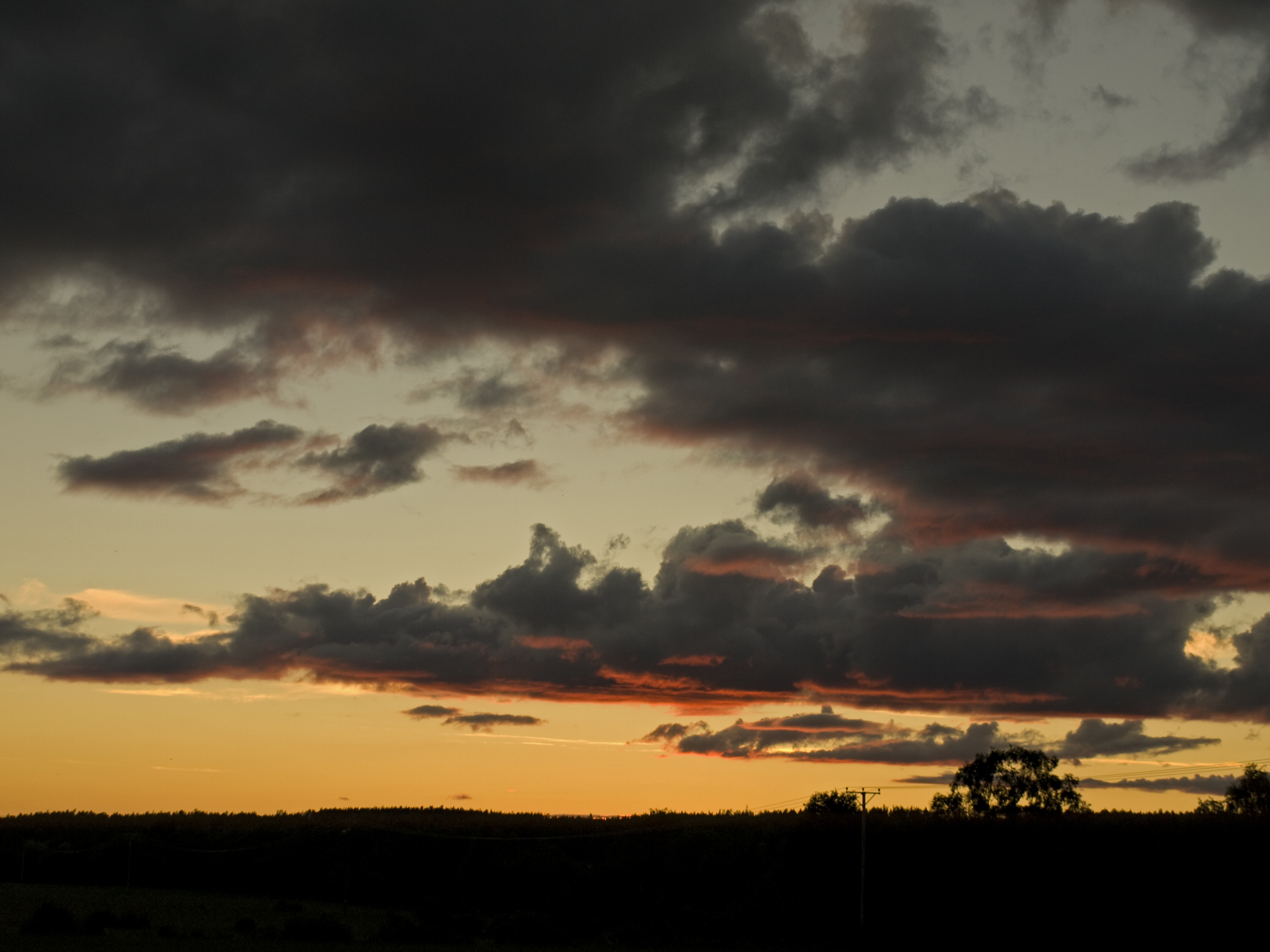

- Coat of arms

- Coordinates: 61°59′N 17°04′E
- Country: Sweden
- County: Gävleborg County
- Seat: Bergsjö

Area
  - Total: 2,525.99 km^{2} (975.29 sq mi)
  - Land: 1,370.64 km^{2} (529.21 sq mi)
  - Water: 1,155.35 km^{2} (446.08 sq mi)
- Area as of 1 January 2014.

Population (30 June 2025)
  - Total: 9,288
  - Density: 6.776/km^{2} (17.55/sq mi)
- Time zone: UTC+1 (CET)
  - Summer (DST): UTC+2 (CEST)
- ISO 3166 code: SE
- Province: Hälsingland
- Municipal code: 2132
- Website: www.nordanstig.se

Nordanstig Municipality (Swedish: Nordanstigs kommun) is a municipality in Gävleborg County, east central Sweden.

The municipal seat is located in Bergsjö.

The municipality was created in 1974 when Bergsjö, Gnarp, Hassela and Harmånger were amalgamated. The name chosen for the new municipality was taken from a corresponding ecclesiastical entity, Nordanstigs kontrakt, which got this name in 1916 on the initiative of Nathan Söderblom, the archbishop of Uppsala.

The current municipal arms was designed in the mid 80s. It depicts: A horse to symbolize the forest and agricultural industry; the net symbolizes fishing and six net mesh to symbolize the six municipal parishes (Hassela, Bergsjö, Ilsbo, Gnarp, Jättendal and Harmånger).

Olympic gold medalist in slalom from 2018 PyongChang, André Myhrer, is born in Bergsjö, Nordanstig municipality.

== Localities ==
- Bergsjö (seat)
- Hassela
- Harmånger
- Gnarp
- Ilsbo
- Jättendal
- Stocka
- Strömsbruk

== Demographics ==
This is a demographic table based on Nordanstig Municipality's electoral districts in the 2022 Swedish general election sourced from SVT's election platform, in turn taken from SCB official statistics.

In total there were 9,475 inhabitants, with 7,393 Swedish citizens of voting age. 47.8% voted for the left coalition and 50.8% for the right coalition. Indicators are in percentage points except population totals and income.

Location	Residents	Citizen adults	Left vote	Right vote	Employed	Swedish parents	Foreign heritage	Income SEK	Degree
Location			%	%					
Bergsjö	2,293	1,770	46.8	51.5	79	86	14	23,024	30
Gnarp	2,267	1,749	45.6	52.7	81	93	7	22,288	27
Harmånger-Ilsbo	1,975	1,495	44.3	54.9	81	90	10	22,291	25
Hassela-Älgered	1,228	998	53.7	45.0	79	89	11	21,835	24
Jättendal-Stocka	1,712	1,381	52.1	46.5	79	90	10	23,018	28
Source: SVT

== Islands ==
- Gran

== Economy ==
The manufacturing industry provides 25% of the employment; service and communications 14%; agriculture, forest and fishing industries 6%; education and research 9%.

Largest private employers were (2004):

1. Strömsbruksfabriken - 150 employees
2. Trima AB - 125 employees
3. Plyfa AB - 80 employees
4. SMP Parts - 50 employees
5. Hassela utbildningscenter - 40 employees
6. Tjärnviks Trä AB - 40 employees

== Sister city ==
Nordanstig has one sister city:

- Holeby, Denmark
