= Gunnborga =

Viking Age Swedish runemaster

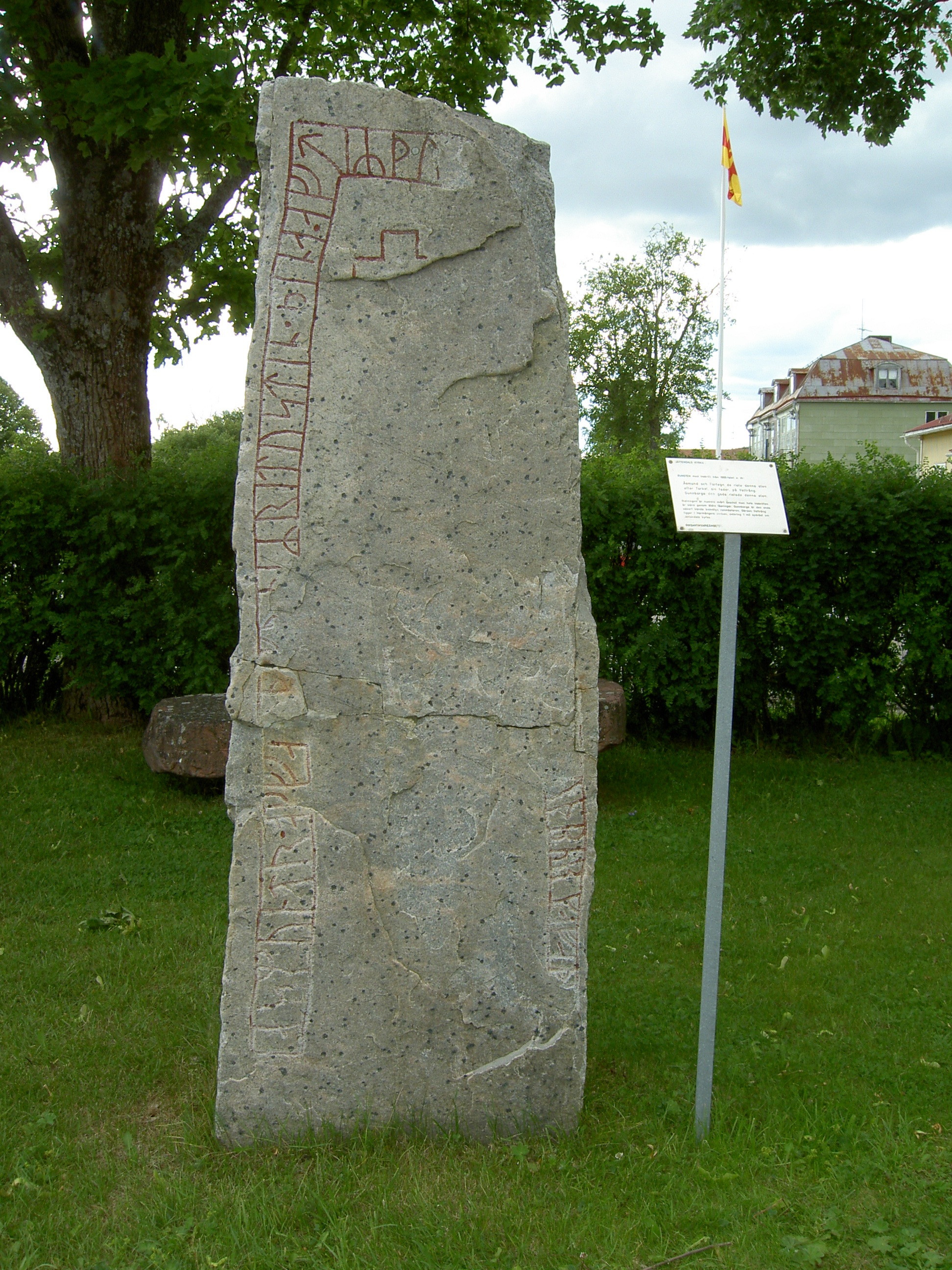
Hälsingland Rune Inscription 21

Gunnborga (fl. 11th century), also known as Gunnborga den goda (lit. 'Gunnborga the Good'), was a Viking Age Swedish runemaster. She was responsible for the Hälsingland Rune Inscription 21, and has been referred to as the only confirmed runemistress; others might have existed, but historical records associated with them, if any (such as runestones and other inscriptions), are yet to be found.

== See also ==
- Frögärd i Ösby
