= Angarnsjöängen =

Nature reserve in Stockholm, Sweden

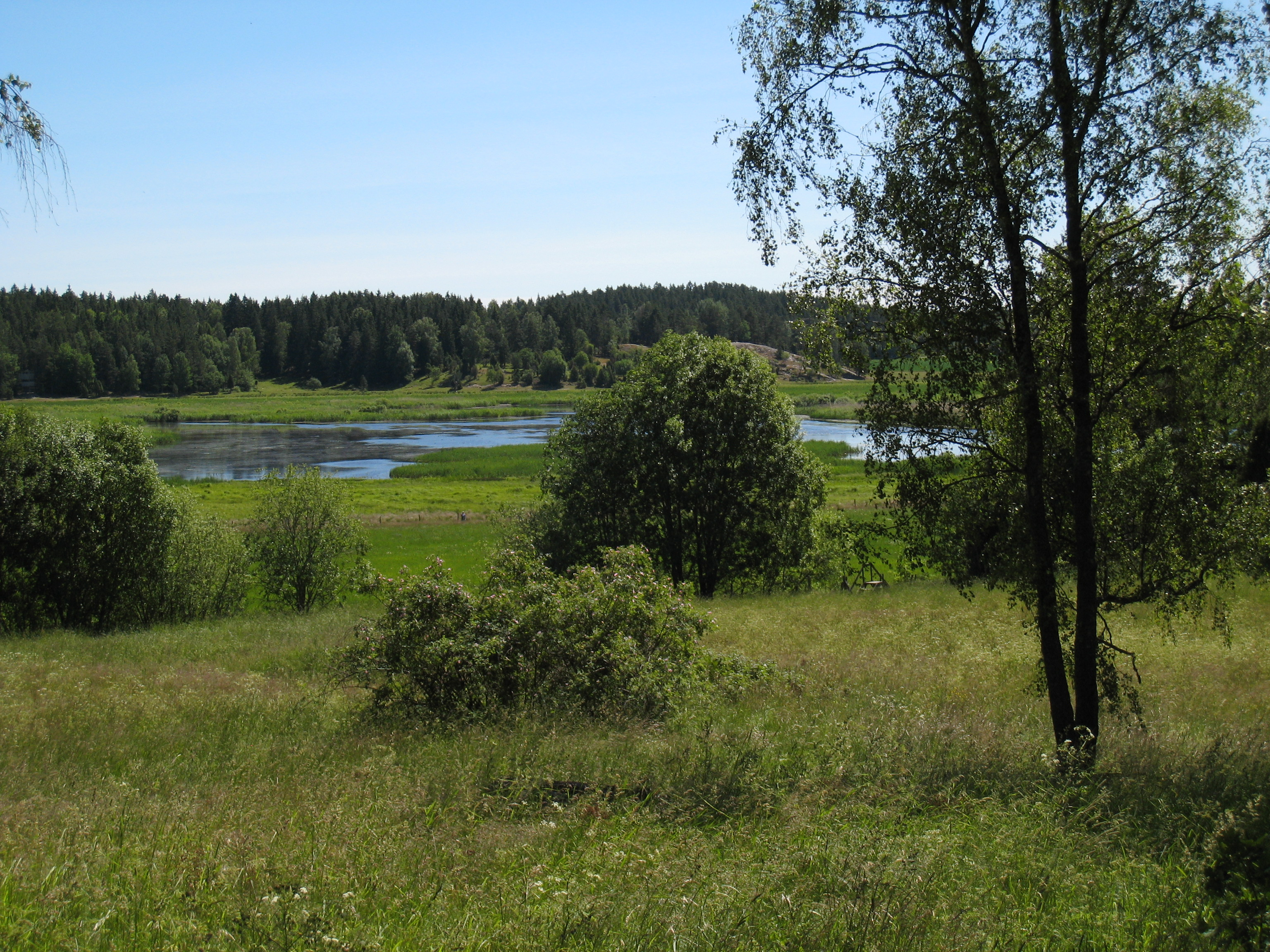
- Angarnsjöängen in early summer

- Location within Sweden
- Location: Stockholm County, Uppland
- Nearest city: Vallentuna
- Coordinates: 59.54972°N 18.15814°E

Angarnsjöängen (Swedish: Lake Angarn Meadow, also spelt Angarnssjöängen) is a nature reserve circa 3 kilometres (3.0 km; 1.9 mi) northeast of Vallentuna, in Southern Uppland, Sweden.

It is a wetland with a varying water level depending on the weather. The water rises dramatically each spring as the snow melts and becomes very low by late summer and autumn, creating a good resting place for wading birds. A wetlands restoration project carried out in 1992 markedly increased both the numbers and the variety of birds visiting the site and nesting there. A total of 250 bird species have been observed there during a year.

Among the bird species known to typically nest in the nature reserve are western marsh harrier, northern lapwing, common redshank and western yellow wagtail.

The Bronze Age Örstar petroglyphs and Runestone U 211 are both in the immediate vicinity. Angarn Church, dating from the 13th century, also lies close to the nature reserve.

== See also ==
- Lingsberg Runestones
