= Balle (runemaster) =

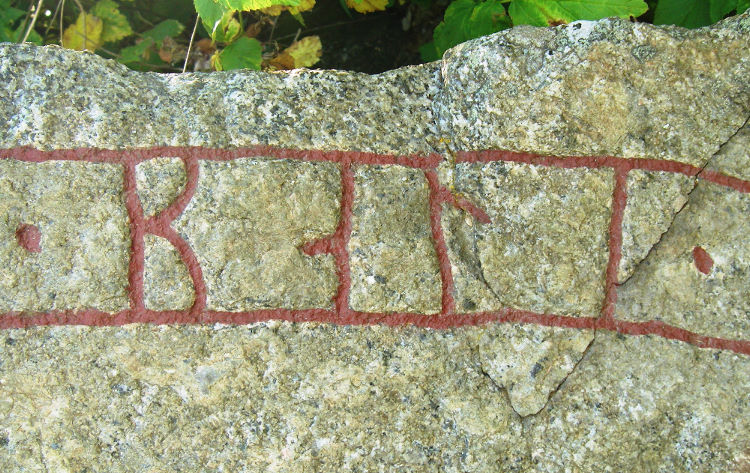
Signature of Balle on runestone U 873 in Örsunda.

Balle (Old Norse: Balliʀ) or Red-Balle (Old Norse: Rauðballiʀ) was a runemaster who was active in the areas of western Uppland, Västmanland, and northern Södermanland of Sweden during the second half of the 11th century.

== Work ==
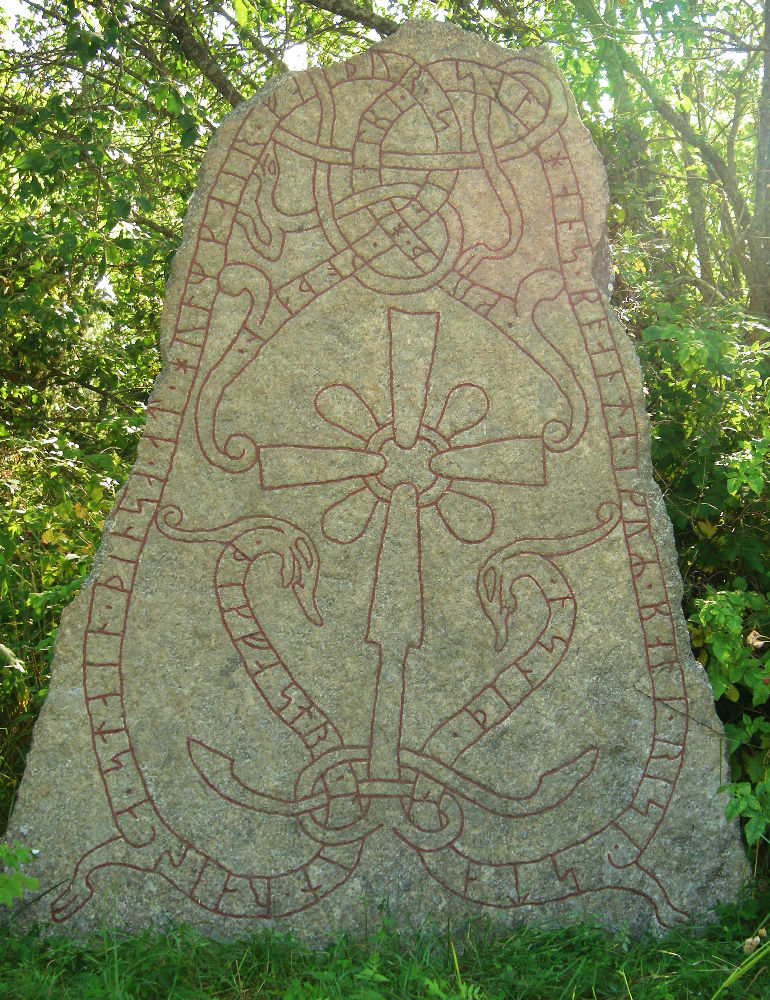
U 873 in Örsunda was signed by Balle.

Most early medieval Scandinavians were probably literate in runes, and most people probably carved messages on pieces of bone and wood. However, it was difficult to make runestones, and in order to master it one also needed to be a stonemason. During the 11th century, when most runestones were raised, there were a few professional runemasters. Balle was active in the later 11th century and his work is representative of the Urnes runestone style. Balle signed about twenty-four surviving runestones in south-western Uppland and northern Södermanland. He often signed his name in the form of Old Norse poetry as exemplified on runestone U 729 in Ågersta. There are also an additional twenty runestones that have been attributed to him for stylistic reasons. Balle was noted for the consistency of his use of a dot as a punctuation mark between the words of his runic inscriptions, and often used dotted e-, g-, and y-runes.

== Signed inscriptions ==
The Rundata catalog lists over twenty inscriptions as being signed by Balle including Sö 92 in Husby Kyrkogård, Sö 203 in Östa, Sö 210 in Klippinge, Sö 214 in Årby, U 647 in Övergran, U 699 in Amnö, U 705 in Öster-Dalby, U 707 in Kungs-Husby, U 721 in Löt, U 726 in Ramby, U 729 in Ågersta, U 740 in Hemsla, U 744 in Gidsmarken, U 750 in Viggby, U 753 in Litslena Prästgård, U 756 in Ullstämma, U 770 in Tjursåker, U 819 in Mysinge, U 829 in Furby, U 873 in Örsunda, U 1161 in Altuna (which was signed by several runemasters), Vs 15 in Lilla Kyringe, and Vs 24 in Hassmyra.

== Red-Balle ==
The runestones Vs 15 in Lilla Kyringe and Vs 24 in Hassmyra were signed by a runemaster named Red-Balle. The runes on both runestones show the name as roþbaliʀ. However, due to differences in ornamentation and orthography on these two signed runestones, some runologists have questioned whether Balle and this Red-Balle were one and the same person.

== Gallery ==
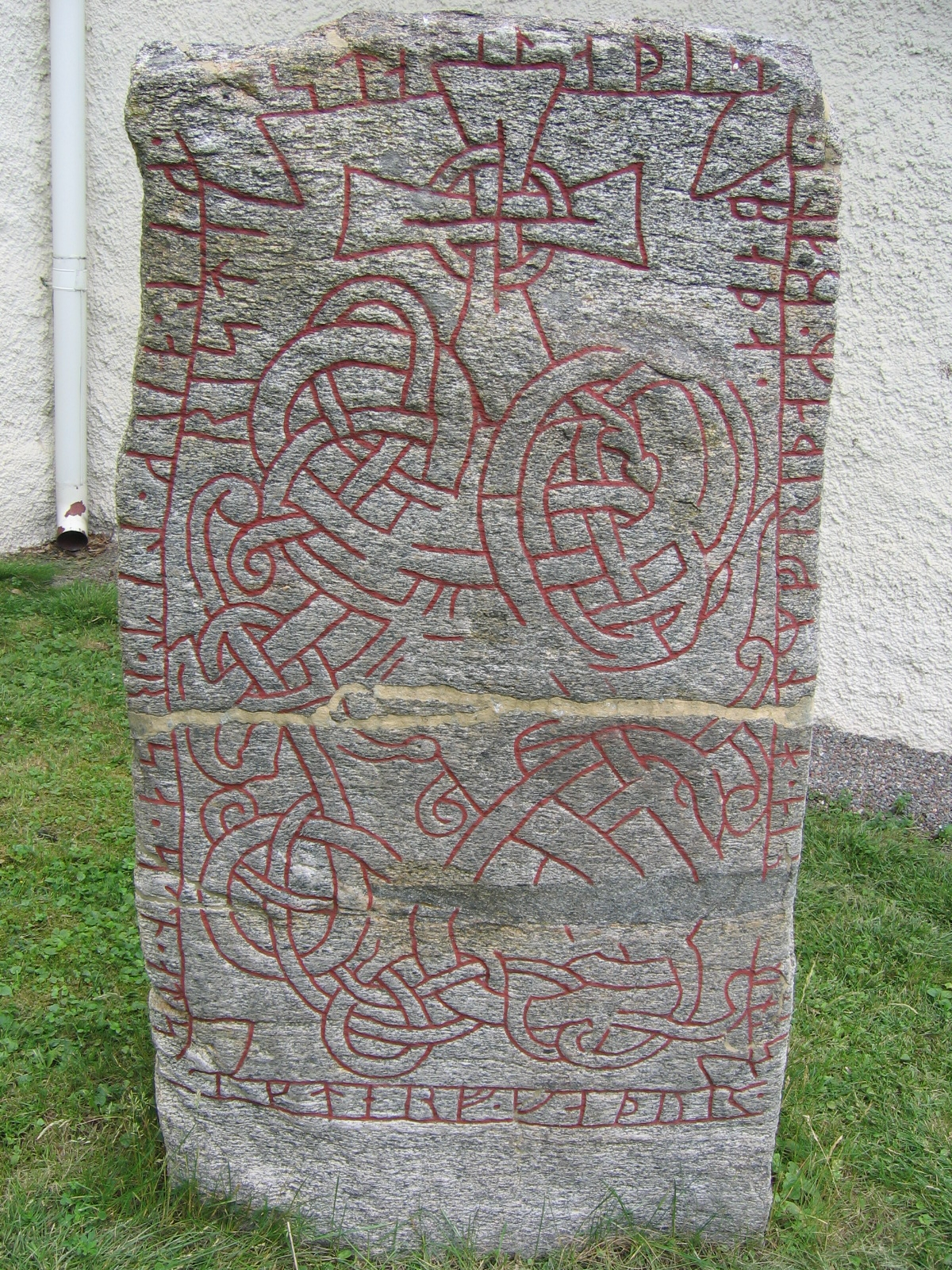
The stone U 647 is signed by Balle.

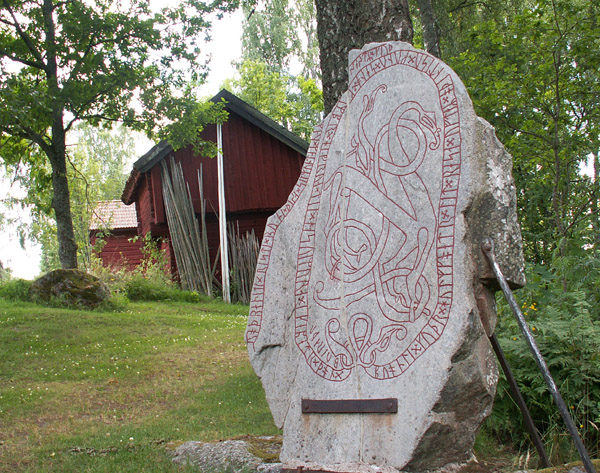
The Odendisa Runestone (Vs 24) is signed by Red-Balle.

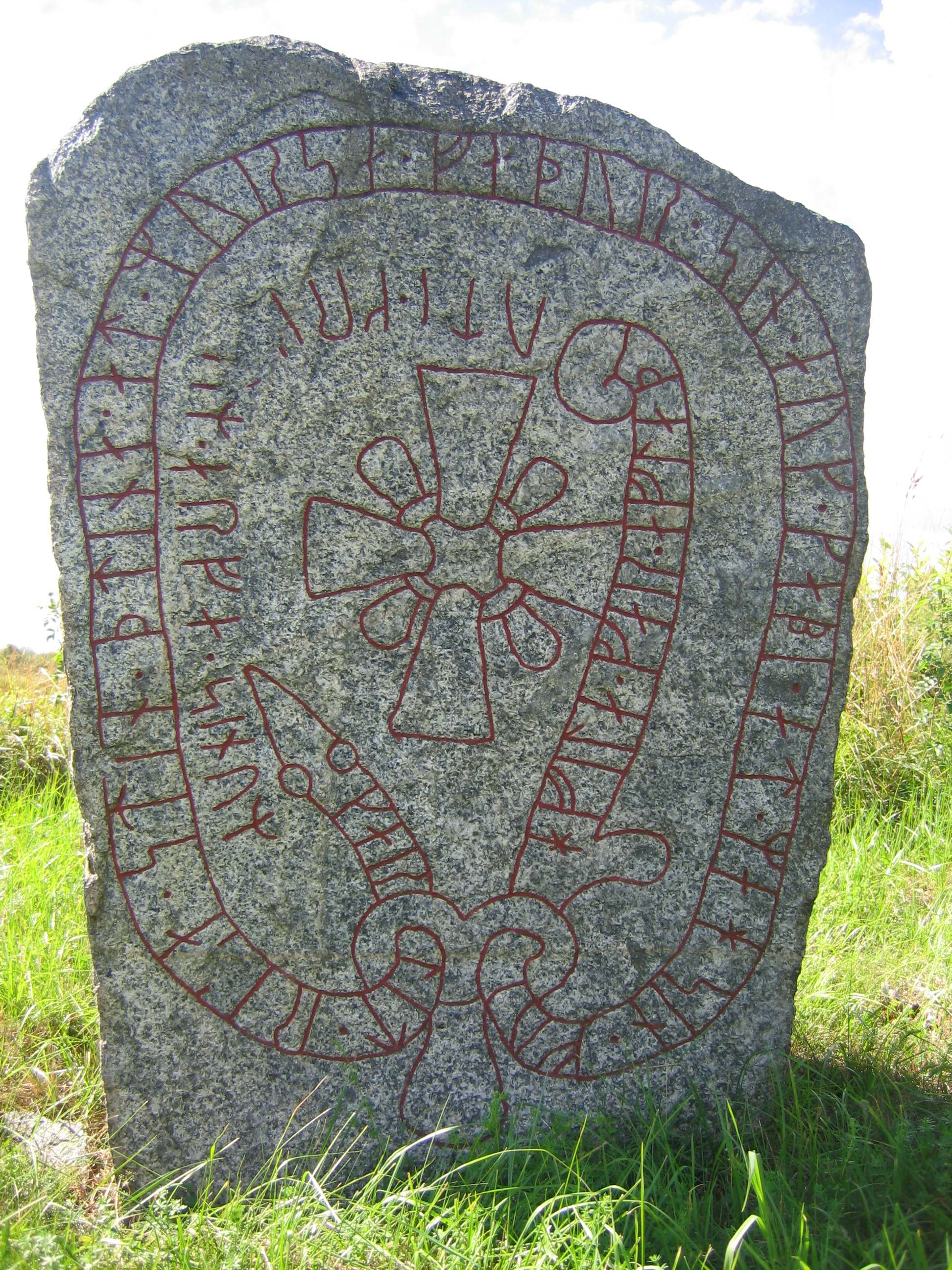
U 792 is attributed to Balle.

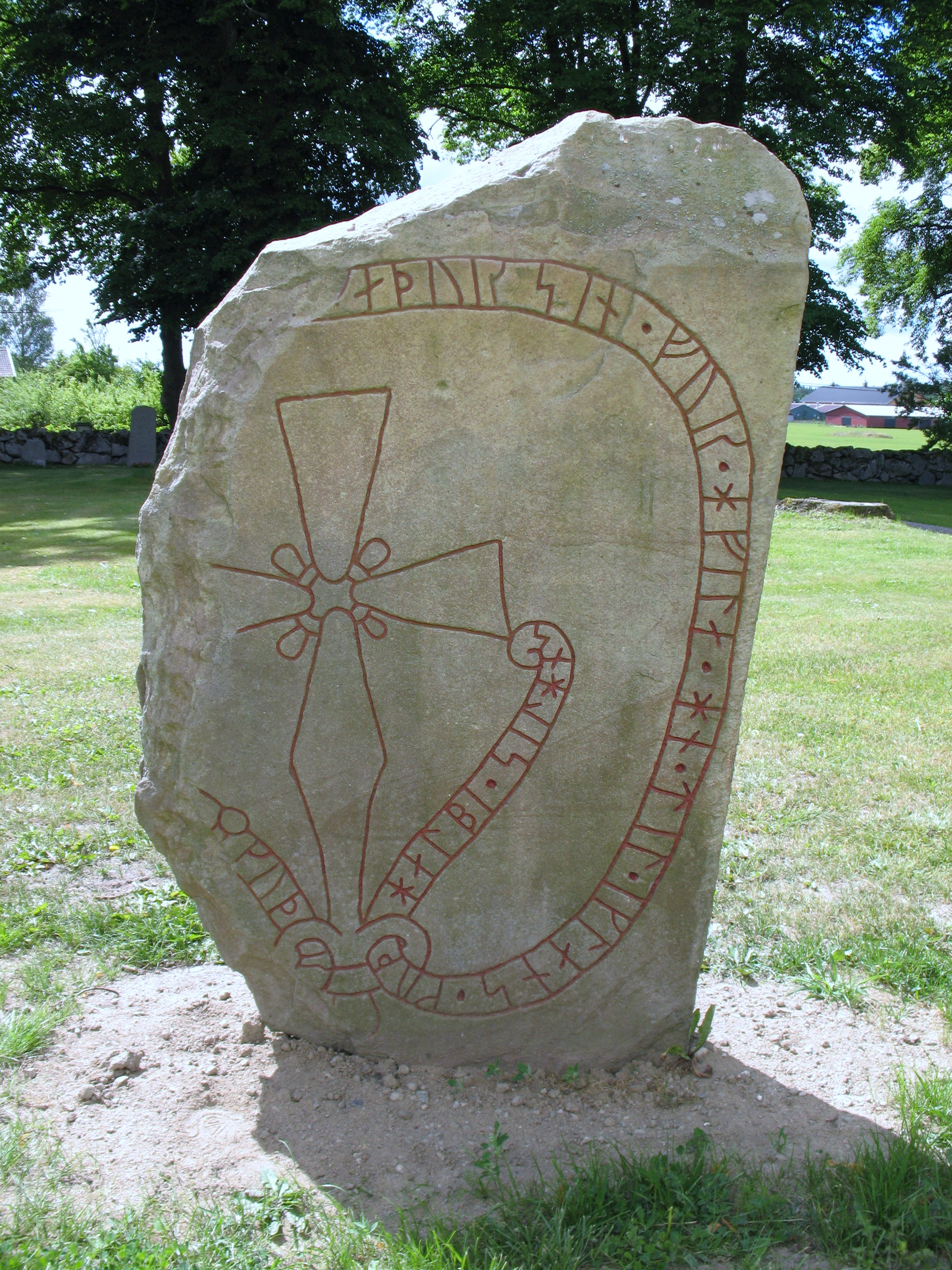
Sö 207 is attributed to Balle.

== Other sources ==
- The article Balle in Nationalencyklopedin (1990).
