= Þorbjörg Lítilvölva =

Norse seeress in 10th century Greenland

Þorbjörg lítilvölva ('Thorbjörg little-völva; c. 10th century CE) was a renowned seeress (völva) in Norse colonial Greenland during the late Viking Age. She is featured in the Saga of Erik the Red and her description is the most detailed presentation of seeress behavior, associated customs, and material culture – such as her distinctive clothing and use of a wand – found in the sagas of Icelanders.

== Saga of Erik the Red ==
According to the saga, times were tough in Greenland; hunters caught few animals, and some simply didn't return at all. In the Norse settlement lived a seeress by the name of Þorbjörg, called the lítilvölva (meaning 'little (or lesser) seeress'). She had nine sisters, all of whom held the gift of prophecy, but Þorbjörg had outlived them all.

Every winter, Þorbjörg visited each farm to which she was invited in the district. She regularly received invitations from those who wanted to know their future, or the future of their farms. One winter, Þorkel, a major farmer, invited Þorbjörg to his farm, and he and his family began making preparations for her arrival:

Sephton translation, 1808:

A high seat was prepared for her, and a cushion laid thereon in which were poultry-feathers.
Now, when she came in the evening, accompanied by the man who had been sent to meet her, she was dressed in such wise that she had a blue mantle over her, with strings for the neck, and it was inlaid with gems quite down to the skirt. On her neck she had glass beads. On her head she had a black hood of lambskin, lined with ermine. A staff she had in her hand, with a knob thereon; it was ornamented with brass, and inlaid with gems round about the knob. Around her she wore a girdle of soft hair, and therein was a large skin-bag, in which she kept the talismans needful to her in her wisdom. She wore hairy calf-skin shoes on her feet, with long and strong-looking thongs to them, and great knobs of latten at the ends. On her hands she had gloves of ermine-skin, and they were white and hairy within.
Now, when she entered, all men thought it their bounden duty to offer her becoming greetings, and these she received according as the men were agreeable to her. The franklin Thorkell took the wise-woman by the hand, and led her to the seat prepared for her. He requested her to cast her eyes over his herd, his household, and his homestead. She remained silent altogether.
During the evening the tables were set; and now I must tell you what food was made ready for the spae-queen. There was prepared for her porridge of kid's milk, and hearts of all kinds of living creatures there found were cooked for her. She had a brazen spoon, and a knife with a handle of walrus-tusk, which was mounted with two rings of brass, and the point of it was broken off.

Kunz translation, 2000:

A high seat was set for her, complete with a cushion. This was to be stuffed with chicken feathers.
When she arrived one evening, along with the man who had been sent to fetch her, she was wearing a black mantle with a strap, which was adorned with precious stones right down to the hem. About her neck she wore a string of glass beads and on her head a hood of black lambskin lined with white catskin. She bore a staff with a knob at the top, adorned with brass set with stones on top. About her waist she had a linked charm belt with a large purse. In it she kept the charms which she needed for her predictions. She wore calfskin boots lined with fur, with long, sturdy laces and large pewter knobs on the ends. On her hands she wore gloves of catskin, white and lined with fur.
When she entered, everyone was supposed to offer her respectful greetings, and she responded by according to how the person appealed to her. Farmer Thorkel took the wise woman by the hand and led her to the seat which had been prepared for her. He then asked her to survey his flock, servants and buildings. She had little to say about all of it.
That evening tables were set up and food prepared for the seeress. A porridge of kid's milk was made for her and as meat she was given the hearts of all the animals available there. She had a spoon of brass and a knife with an ivory shaft, its two halves clasped with bronze bands, and the point of which had broken off.

After the tables were cleared, Þorkel asked Þorbjörg what she thought of the estate and the household's conduct, and how soon he could expect a response to his questions about the future, as everyone was eager to know. Þorbjörg said she would not provide a response until having spent a night at the farm.

Late the next day, people at the farmstead provided her with "things she required to carry out her magic rites." Þorbjörg asked if any woman present knew varðlokkur (Old Norse 'ward enticers, ward songs'), chants necessary to carry out magic rites. No woman present knew the charms. The people of the household asked around the settlement until a woman named Gudrid (introduced earlier in the saga) responded that, "I have neither magical powers nor the gift of prophecy, but in Iceland my foster-mother, Halldis, taught me chants she called ward songs".

Þorbjörg responded that this was more than she expected. Gudrid, however, says that because she is a Christian woman, she intends to take no part in the seeress's activities. Þorbjörg, undaunted, says, "It could be that you could help the people by so doing, and you'd be no worse a woman for that. But I expect Thorkel to provide me with what I need."

Þorkel urged Gudrid to assist the seeress, and she agreed. Together the women "formed a warding ring around the platform raised for sorcery, with Þorbjörg perched atop it." Gudrid successfully sang the chants, impressing those in attendance with the beauty of her voice.

Þorbjörg thanked Gudrid for her assistance, and said that earlier the spirits refused to do her bidding, but that the spirits had been attracted to Gudrid's beautiful voice. The seeress said that she can now see clearly into the future, and that the hardships the farmers faced would clear up as spring arrives, and that the sickness that plagued the people there would also soon improve. For her help, the seeress provided special insight for Gudrid, predicting her future, and wished her well.

The ceremony over, farmers approached the seeress to learn what was in store for them. The saga informs the reader that she provided answers for them, and that "little that she predicted did not occur". After, a retinue arrived to escort her to another farm.

== Scholarly reception ==
According to philologist and religious studies scholar Rudolf Simek, Saga of Erik the Red may be an embellished literary narrative but details regarding the seeress, such as the high seat, staff, and the circle derive from historical practices in Germanic paganism.

== See also ==
- Séance
