= Runemaster =

Specialist in making runestones

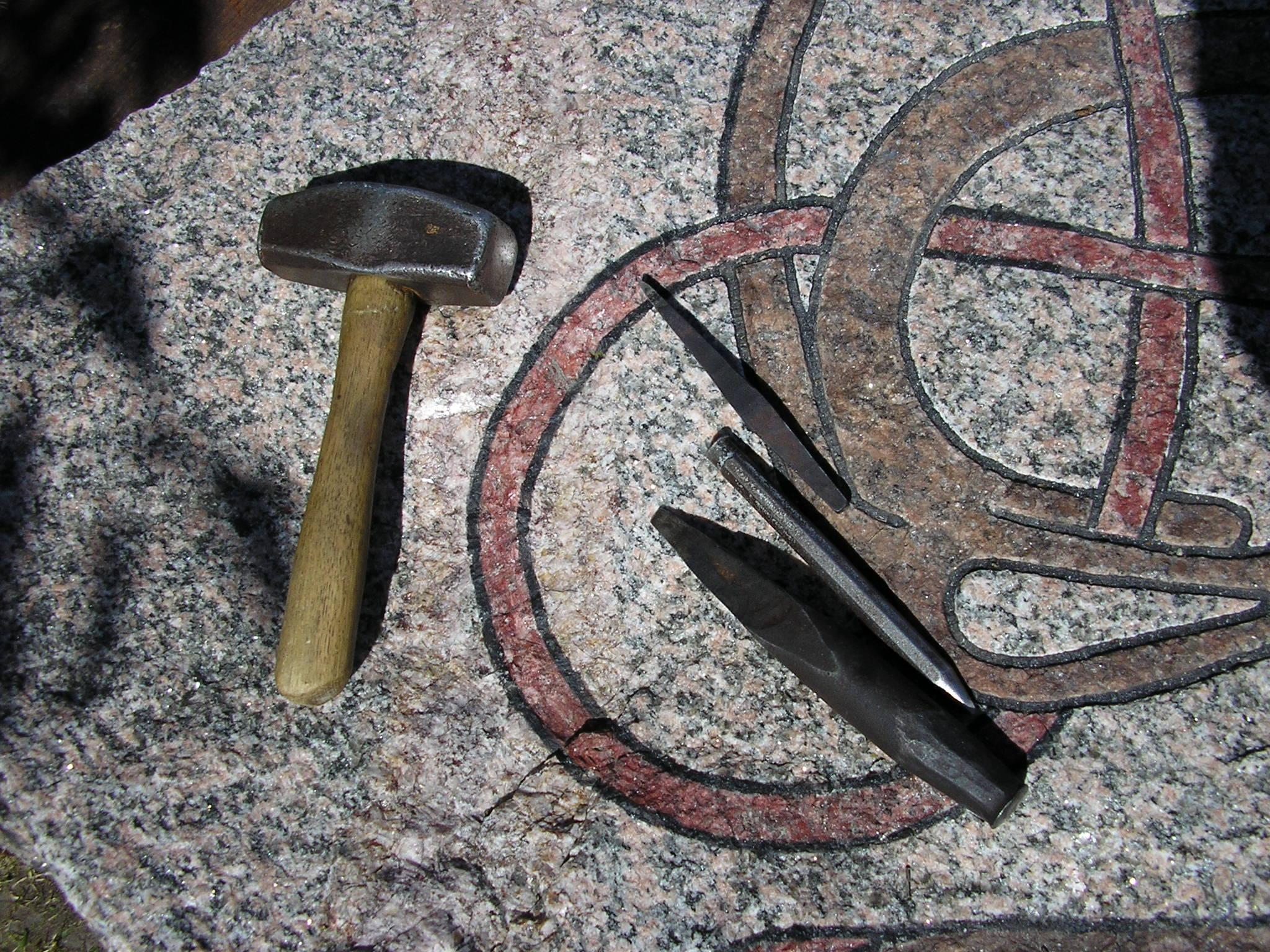
A runestone being made by the modern runemaster Kalle Dahlberg

A runemaster or runecarver is a specialist in making runestones.

== Description ==
More than 100 names of runemasters are known from Viking Age Sweden with most of them from 11th-century eastern Svealand. Many anonymous runestones have more or less securely been attributed to these runemasters. During the 11th century, when most runestones were raised, there were a few professional runemasters. They and their apprentices were contracted to make runestones and when the work was finished, they sometimes signed the stone with the name of the runemaster. Many of the uncovered runic inscriptions have likely been completed by non-professional runecarvers for the practical purposes of burial rites or record-keeping. Due to the depictions of daily life, many of the nonprofessional runecarvers could have been anything from pirates to soldiers, merchants, or farmers. The layout of Scandinavian towns provided centers where craftspeople could congregate and share trade knowledge. After the spread of Christianity in these regions, and the increase in runic literacy that followed, runes were used for record-keeping and found on things like weapons, ivory, and coins.

Most early medieval Scandinavians were probably literate in runes, and most people probably carved messages on pieces of bone and wood. However, it was difficult to make runestones, and in order to master it one also needed to be a stonemason.

Some attributions were given to runic skalds, or poets, indicating that many of the runemasters were likely authors of skaldic poetry and oral tradition who had connection to royalty by way of documenting their deeds and offering counsel.

A number of historians have theorized that there may be a connection between the word erilaz (individual proficient in runes) in the proto-Scandinavian priesthood and the old Norse title "jarl" (chieftain, heir to the throne). This suggests that it is possible that those who were versed in runic arts formed their own secular upper class of learned runemasters. This claim is corroborated by the geographical distribution of runestones throughout Eastern Norway, but there is not enough linguistic or philological evidence to strongly support it. Whether or not a linguistic link can be made, however, it is likely that the runemasters in Norway during the Viking Age would have formed an upper class due to their portrayal in ruins as near the top of the social hierarchy but still subservient to the chieftain.

Towards the middle of the 11th century, the practice of carving runes that depict figures in Norse mythology decreased, and instead traditional religious imagery began to hybridize with Christian imagery. This continued with the increasing prominence of runestones that accompanied the rise of Christianity. Runemasters began to document the indulgences offered by the Catholic Church in exchange for public works projects such as the construction of bridges and roads, a donation to a church, or the beginning of a pilgrimage. Many of the runic inscriptions carved during this time were done so "for the pleasure of God," or to ensure the safe passage of one's soul.

The runemaster Öpir's signature on runestone U 1072 in Bälinge

Runes were often erected by long-distance explorers seeking to document their visits or memorialize their fallen comrades. Runecarvers on commission or on their own carved memorials and gravestones more than anything else. In addition, memorial runes could provide additional details about an individual's death with more accuracy than oral tradition.

== Notable runemasters ==
Notable runemasters of the 11th to early 12th centuries include:

- Åsmund Kåresson
- Balle
- Fot
- Frögärd i Ösby
- Gunnborga
- Halvdan
- Öpir
- Torgöt Fotsarve (son of Fot)
- Ulf of Borresta
- Visäte

== See also ==
- List of runestones
