= Gästrikland Runic Inscription 7 =

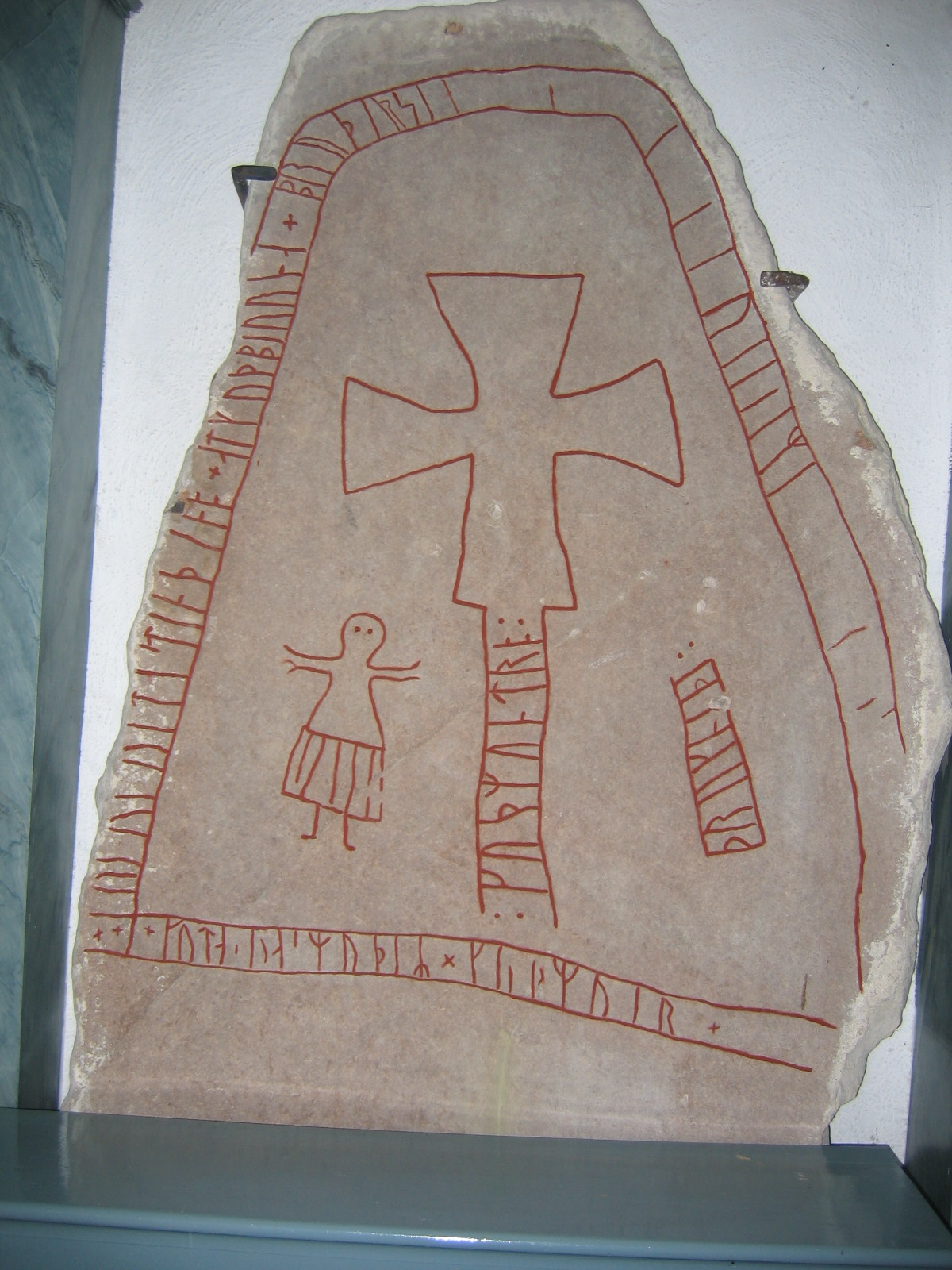
Runestone Gs 7 in Torsåker, Sweden.

Gästrikland Runic Inscription 7 or Gs 7 is the Rundata catalog number for a Viking Age memorial runestone located in Torsåker, Gävleborg County, Sweden, which was part of the historic province of Gästrikland.

== Description ==
This runestone is composed of limestone and is 2.1 meters in height. The runestone is located in the porch of the Torsåker church. The inscription consists of runic text in the younger futhark in a band surrounding a Christian cross. In the inscription, the runes kuþmuntro for the name Guðmundr, which the text says was a man who drowned, are depicted directly below the cross. To the left of the name is a depiction of a woman that is 22 centimeters in height. The composition balances the figure of the woman with the runes þrukn-þi for the word druknaði ("drowned") on the other side of the name.

The inscription is classified as being carved in runestone style RAK, which is the style classification for runic text that is within straight bands that do not have any serpent or animal heads attached. The inscription is unsigned but has been attributed to the runemaster Åsmund, who was active in the first half of the eleventh century. Åsmund used two bind runes in this runic text, combining in stin the s-rune and t-rune for the word stein ("stone") and in bruþur combining the u-rune and r-rune for the word bróður ("brother").

Of the personal names listed in the inscription, Guðbjôrn means "God's Bear" and Guðmundr means "God's Hand." The use of the common name element Guð in the two names would indicate that they were members of the same family, although the runic text, which is damaged and incomplete, does not directly state this. A common practice at that time in Scandinavia was the repeating one of the name elements from a parent's name in the names of the children to show the family connection.

== Inscription ==
=== Transliteration of the runes into Latin characters ===
× -(u)(i)(r)(i) riti s=tin þino × at kuþbiurna × bruþu=r si-... ...m... × kuta ' uas muþiʀ × kuþmu-r × ... : kuþmuntro : þrukn-þi :

=== Transcription into Old Norse ===
<-uiri> rétti stein þenna at Guðbjôrn, bróður si[nn] ... <kuta> var móðir Guðmu[nda]r. ... Guðmundr drukn[a]ði.

=== Translation in English ===
... erected this stone in memory of Guðbjôrn, his brother ... <kuta> was Guðmundr's mother ... Guðmundr drowned.

== See also ==
- List of runestones
