= Torsåker, Hofors Municipality =

Torsåker
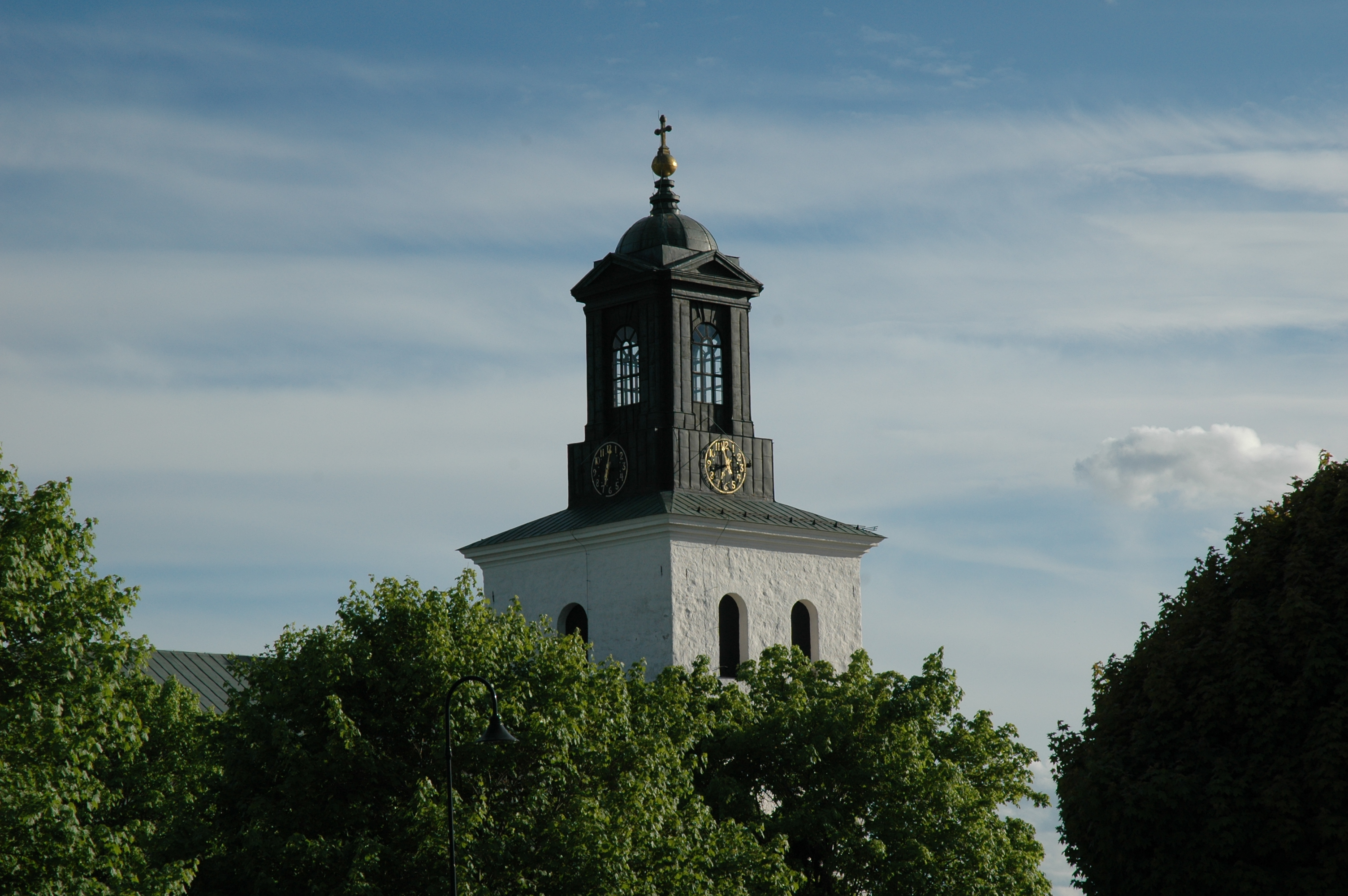
- Torsåker Church in June 2010

- Location within Sweden Gävleborg Location within Sweden
- Coordinates: 60°31′N 16°29′E
- Country: Sweden
- Province: Gästrikland
- County: Gävleborg County
- Municipality: Hofors Municipality

Area
  - Total: 1.22 km^{2} (0.47 sq mi)

Population (31 December 2010)
  - Total: 899
  - Density: 738/km^{2} (1,910/sq mi)
- Time zone: UTC+1 (CET)
  - Summer (DST): UTC+2 (CEST)

Torsåker is a locality situated in Hofors Municipality, Gävleborg County, Sweden with 899 inhabitants in 2010. It contains a parish for the Archdiocese of Uppsala. The church at Torsåker has two runestones, Gs 7 and Gs 8.

== Etymology ==
Torsåker has the Norse pagan god Thor as an element along with Old Norse akr or áker, "arable land." The typical translation for the name is "Thor's field" and was often originally used as the name of a farm.

== Notable people ==
- Elov Persson (1894-1970), Swedish cartoonist and comic artist
- Erik Gabrielsson Emporagrius (1606-1674), Swedish professor and bishop
- Kerstin Hesselgren (1872–1962), first woman elected into the upper house of Swedish parliament
