= Results of the 1914 Swedish general election =

Results of the 1914 Swedish general election may refer to:

- Results of the March 1914 Swedish general election
- Results of the September 1914 Swedish general election
