= List of shipwrecks in November 1836 =

The list of shipwrecks in November 1836 includes ships sunk, foundered, wrecked, grounded, or otherwise lost during November 1836.

== 1 November ==
List of shipwrecks: 1 November 1836
Ship	State	Description
Britannia	United Kingdom	The ship ran aground on the Zuidwal, in the Wadden Sea. Her crew were rescued. She was on a voyage from Newcastle upon Tyne, Northumberland to Amsterdam, North Holland, Netherlands. Britannia was refloated on 10 November.
Devereux	United Kingdom	The ship was wrecked on the English Bank, off the coast of Uruguay. She was on a voyage from "Bona Vista" to Montevideo, Uruguay.
Elise	United Kingdom	The ship was driven ashore at Memel, Prussia. Her crew were rescued. She was on a voyage from Liverpool, Lancashire to Memel.
Victory	United Kingdom	The ship was driven ashore and wrecked at Portreath, Cornwall. She had previously been abandoned.

== 2 November ==
List of shipwrecks: 2 November 1836
Ship	State	Description
Alfred	United Kingdom	The brig was driven ashore near Memel, Prussia. Her crew were rescued. Found to be hogged on her port side, she was condemned on 9 November.
Porto Salvo	Chile	The ship was driven ashore and wrecked at Montevideo, Uruguay. Her crew were rescued. She was on a voyage from Buenos Aires, Argentina to Valparaíso.
Scotia	United Kingdom	The ship struck the Seven Stones Reef and was severely damaged. She was on a voyage from Cardiff, Glamorgan to Blyth, Northumberland. Scotia put into St. Ives, Cornwall in a sinking condition. She was repaired.
Vidonia	United Kingdom	The schooner was wrecked at Den Helder, North Holland, Netherlands. All on board were rescued. She was on a voyage from London to Bremen.

== 3 November ==
List of shipwrecks: 3 November 1836
Ship	State	Description
Limena	Peru	The ship collided with USS Brandywine (United States Navy) off Callao and was severely damaged. She was on a voyage from Callao to Igargue. Limena put back to Callao for repairs.
Maria	Kingdom of Hanover	The ship capsized with the loss of a crew member. She was on a voyage from Memel, Prussia to Emden.
Mary and Helen	United Kingdom	The ship was driven ashore and damaged at Newton-by-the-Sea, Northumberland. She was on a voyage from Newcastle upon Tyne, Northumberland to Anstruther, Fife.

== 4 November ==
List of shipwrecks: 4 November 1836
Ship	State	Description
Clansman	United Kingdom	The barque was driven ashore on Hogland, Russia. She was on a voyage from Saint Petersburg, Russia to Newcastle upon Tyne, Northumberland.
Experiment	United Kingdom	The ship was driven ashore and wrecked at Breaksea Point, Glamorgan. She was on a voyage from Drogheda, County Louth to Newport, Monmouthshire.
Sonne	France	The ship was driven ashore at Domesnes, Norway. She was on a voyage from Riga, Russia to Dunkirk, Nord.

== 5 November ==
List of shipwrecks: 5 November 1836
Ship	State	Description
Norval	United Kingdom	The ship was driven ashore and wrecked at Crosby, Lancashire. All on board were rescued. She was on a voyage from Saint John, New Brunswick, British North America to Liverpool, Lancashire.
Pilot	United Kingdom	The ship sprang a leak and foundered in the North Sea 30 nautical miles (56 km) off Lowestoft, Suffolk. Her crew were rescued. She was on a voyage from Wemyss, Fife to Antwerp, Belgium.
Six Sisters	United Kingdom	The brig was driven ashore at Wexford, where she was subsequently wrecked. Her crew were rescued. She was on a voyage from Quebec City to Lancaster, Lancashire.
Sovereign	United Kingdom	The ship was wrecked near Mundesley, Norfolk. Her crew were rescued. She was on a voyage from Southwold, Suffolk to Wakefield, Yorkshire.

== 6 November ==
List of shipwrecks: 6 November 1836
Ship	State	Description
Francis and Harriet	United Kingdom	The barque was driven ashore at Domesnes, Norway and was abandoned by her crew.

== 7 November ==
List of shipwrecks: 7 November 1836
Ship	State	Description
Agenoria	United Kingdom	The ship was driven ashore on Saaremaa, Russia. She was on a voyage from Riga, Russia to Dundee, Forfarshire.
Agnes	United Kingdom	The ship departed from Limerick for Portsmouth, Hampshire. No further trace, presumed foundered with the loss of all hands.
Bonita	United Kingdom	The ship was driven ashore near Wells-next-the-Sea, Norfolk. She was refloated on 16 November and taken in to Blakeney, Norfolk in a severely damaged condition.
Caroline	United Kingdom	The ship was driven ashore near Wells-next-the-Sea. She was refloated on 16 November.
Henry William	United Kingdom	The ship sank at King's Lynn, Norfolk. She was on a voyage from Swansea, Glamorgan to King's Lynn.
Laura	(United Kingdom of Great Britain and Ireland) Jersey	The ship was wrecked on the coast of Friesland, Netherlands with the loss of all but one of her crew. She was on a voyage from Danzig to Jersey.
Lord John Russell	United Kingdom	The ship was wrecked on the Sizewell Bank, in the North Sea off the coast of Suffolk. Her crew were rescued. She was on a voyage from Sunderland, County Durham to London.

== 8 November ==
List of shipwrecks: 8 November 1836
Ship	State	Description
Brilliant	United Kingdom	The ship departed from Bayonne, Basses-Pyrénées, France for the Western Isles. No further trace, presumed foundered with the loss of all hands.
Catharina	Bremen	The ship was wrecked on the Tegeler Sand, at the mouth of the Weser with the loss of all but two of her crew. She was on a voyage from Gloucester, United Kingdom to Bremen.

== 9 November ==
List of shipwrecks: 9 November 1836
Ship	State	Description
Boyne	United Kingdom	The ship was driven ashore at Skegness, Lincolnshire. Her crew were rescued. She was on a voyage from London to Goole, Yorkshire.
Fowler	United Kingdom	The ship was driven ashore and severely damaged at Alnmouth, Northumberland.
Leander	United Kingdom	The ship was wrecked on the Cross Sand, in the North Sea off the coast of Norfolk, United Kingdom. Her crew were rescued by the Great Yarmouth Lifeboat. She was on a voyage from Havre de Grâce, Seine-Inférieure, France to Sunderland, County Durham.
Onderneming	Netherlands	The ship departed from Texel, North Holland for Hull, Yorkshire, United Kingdom. No further trace, presumed foundered in the North Sea with the loss of all hands.
Solid	United States	The ship was driven ashore at Squam Beach, New Jersey. She was on a voyage from Livorno, Grand Duchy of Tuscany to New York.
Wellington	United Kingdom	The ship foundered in the North Sea off Lowestoft, Suffolk.

== 10 November ==
List of shipwrecks: 10 November 1836
Ship	State	Description
Gambia	United States	The ship capsized in the Atlantic Ocean with the loss of five lives. She was on a voyage from New York to Lisbon, Portugal.
Haabelanker	Norway	The ship was driven ashore at Deal, Kent, United Kingdom. She was on a voyage from Sandefjord to Dieppe, Seine-Inférieure, France. Haabelanker was later refloated and taken in to Ramsgate, Kent.
James	United States	The ship was driven ashore at New York.

== 11 November ==
List of shipwrecks: 11 November 1836
Ship	State	Description
Fame	United Kingdom	The schooner was wrecked on the Coal Bank, at the mouth of the River Tay. Her four crew survived. She was on a voyage from Boston, Lincolnshire to Dundee, Forfarshire.
Peru	United Kingdom	The brig was wrecked near Adra, Spain. Her crew were rescued. She was on a voyage from Liverpool, Lancashire to Adra.
Tumperance	United Kingdom	The ship was wrecked on "Reef Island". She was on a voyage from Saint Domingo to Halifax, Nova Scotia, British North America.

== 12 November ==
List of shipwrecks: 12 November 1836
Ship	State	Description
Betsey	United Kingdom	The ship was wrecked off the Isle of Man. Her crew were rescued. She was on a voyage from Flint to a Norwegian port.
Briton	United Kingdom	The ship was wrecked at "Rathwelan", County Waterford. Her crew were rescued. She was on a voyage from Llanelly, Glamorgan to Ross-on-Wye, Herefordshire.
Dart	United Kingdom	The ship was driven ashore at Flamborough Head, Yorkshire. She was on a voyage from Dover, Kent to Newcastle upon Tyne, Northumberland. Dart was later refloated and taken in to Bridlington, Yorkshire.
Emanuel	Duchy of Holstein	The ship was run down and sunk in the North Sea off Heligoland by the steamship Britannia (United Kingdom). Her crew were rescued by Britannia. Emanuel was on a voyage from Neustadt in Holstein to Antwerp, Belgium.
Frau Anna	Hamburg	The ship collided with Paragon (United Kingdom) and sank in the Elbe. She was on a voyage from Amsterdam, North Holland, Netherlands to Hamburg. Paragon was severely damaged.
George	United Kingdom	The schooner was lost near Burrow Head, Wigtownshire with the loss of all hands. She was on a voyage from Liverpool, Lancashire to Newcastle upon Tyne, Northumberland.
Howard	United Kingdom	The ship collided with Clarence (United Kingdom) in the Firth of Forth and sank. Her crew were rescued. She was on a voyage from Ipswich, Suffolk to Grangemouth, Stirlingshire.
Little Bray	United Kingdom	The ship was driven ashore east of Bideford, Devon. She was on a voyage from Cardiff, Glamorgan to London.
Nancy	United Kingdom	The ship was driven ashore on The Rosses, County Donegal. Her crew were rescued. She was on a voyage from Quebec City, Lower Canada, British North America to Ballyshannon, County Donegal.

== 13 November ==
List of shipwrecks: 13 November 1836
Ship	State	Description
Betsey	United Kingdom	The ship was wrecked near "Poolwash", Isle of Man. Her crew were rescued. She was on a voyage from Flint to Newry, County Antrim.
Caribbean	United States	The ship was lost off Karlskrona, Russia. Her crew were rescued. She was on a voyage from Pillau, Prussia to Boston, Massachusetts.
Edward	United Kingdom	The ship ran aground and capsized at Sligo. She was on a voyage from Liverpool, Lancashire to Sligo.
Fortuna	Norway	The ship was driven ashore at Rye, Sussex, United Kingdom. She was on a voyage from St. Martin's to Bergen.
Lynx	France	The ship was driven ashore on the Île de Ré, Charente Maritime. Her crew were rescued. She was on a voyage from La Guayra, Venezuela to Bordeaux, Gironde.
Neptune	United Kingdom	The ship collided with Harriet Scott in the Bay of St Lawrence and was abandoned.

== 14 November ==
List of shipwrecks: 14 November 1836
Ship	State	Description
Ajax	United States	The ship was lost on the Carysfort Reef. Her crew were rescued. She was on a voyage from New York to Mobile, Alabama.
Francis William	United Kingdom	The sloop ran ashore and sank at Rattray Head, Aberdeenshire. Her crew were rescued. She was on a voyage from Cullen, Moray to London.
Hermes	United Kingdom	The ship caught fire at Dundee, Forfarshire and was damaged.
Nancy	United Kingdom	The schooner was driven ashore and wrecked at The Rosses, County Donegal.
Providence	United Kingdom	The ship was driven ashore at East Point, Prince Edward Island, British North America. She was on a voyage from Quebec City, Lower Canada to a port in New Brunswick.
Sophia	United Kingdom	The ship was wrecked near Great Placentia, Newfoundland. She was on a voyage from Demerara to Newfoundland. The wreck was taken in to a port on 10 February 1837.
Star	United Kingdom	The ship was lost near Sulina, Ottoman Empire.
Tweed	United Kingdom	The ship foundered in the English Channel off the coast of Sussex.

== 15 November ==
List of shipwrecks: 15 November 1836
Ship	State	Description
Elizabeth	United Kingdom	The collier ran aground on the North Sand.
Success	United Kingdom	The ship was wrecked at Lamaline, Newfoundland, British North America. She was on a voyage from Demerara to Newfoundland. The wreck was taken into a port on 10 February 1837.
Talisman	United States	The brig was wrecked on the English Bank, off Montevideo, Uruguay.

== 16 November ==
List of shipwrecks: 16 November 1836
Ship	State	Description
Samuel Harvey	United Kingdom	The ship was wrecked at St. Alban's Head, Dorset. She was on a voyage from Waterford to London.

== 17 November ==
List of shipwrecks: 17 November 1836
Ship	State	Description
Eden	United Kingdom	The ship struck the Sheringham Shoal, in the North Sea off the coast of Norfolk and sank. Her crew were rescued by a fishing smack. She was on a voyage from Newcastle upon Tyne to London.
Henrietta	United Kingdom	The ship was abandoned in the Dogger Bank.
Nancy	United Kingdom	The schooner was driven ashore at The Rosses, County Donegal. She was on a voyage from Quebec City, Lower Canada, British North America to Ballyshannon, County Donegal. Nancy was refloated on 21 November and taken in to Rutland Island, County Donegal.
William	United Kingdom	The West Indiaman, a barque, was driven ashore at the Birling Gap, Sussex. Her eighteen crew were rescued. She was on a voyage from London to Saint Vincent. William broke up on 24 November.

== 18 November ==
List of shipwrecks: 18 November 1836
Ship	State	Description
Hannah	United Kingdom	The ship sprang a leak and was beached at Penarth, Glamorgan. She was on a voyage from Newport, Monmouthshire to Liverpool, Lancashire. Hannah was refloated on 21 November.
Sara Anna Margaretha	Netherlands	The ship was wrecked on the Haaks Bank, in the North Sea. Her crew were rescued. She was on a voyage from Dram, Norway to Amsterdam, North Holland.
Sligo	United Kingdom	The ship was wrecked on "Ennis Quay". Her crew were rescued.

== 19 November ==
List of shipwrecks: 19 November 1836
Ship	State	Description
Eagle	United Kingdom	The ship caught fire in the River Thames and was damaged.
Iko	(United Kingdom of Great Britain and Ireland) Saint Domingo	The ship was wrecked on Conception Island, Bahamas.
Pleiades	United Kingdom	The ship was driven ashore in the Weser. She was refloated on 23 November and taken in to Cuxhaven.

== 20 November ==
List of shipwrecks: 20 November 1836
Ship	State	Description
Bristol	United Kingdom	The ship was driven ashore and wrecked at East Rockaway, New York with the loss of 73 lives. She was on a voyage from Liverpool, Lancashire to New York City.
Champion	United States	The ship was wrecked on the Salt Key. She was on a voyage from New Orleans, Louisiana to Havre de Grâce, Seine-Inférieure, France.e
Dove	United Kingdom	The ship was wrecked on the Herd Sand, in the North Sea off the coast of County Durham. Her crew were rescued by the South Shields Lifeboat. She was on a voyage from Saint Petersburg, Russia to London. She broke up on 23 November.
Fareham	United Kingdom	The ship departed from Sligo for London. No further trace, presumed foundered with the loss of all hands.
Marie Angelique	France	The ship was wrecked whilst on a voyage from Málaga, Spain to Bordeaux, Gironde.
Reaper	United States	The whaler capiszed in a hurricane and foundered in the Pacific Ocean between "Vavou" and Sandwich Island. Her crew were rescued by Atlantic (United States).
Richmond	United States	The barque departed from Trieste for New York. No further trace, presumed foundered with the loss of all hands.

== 21 November ==
List of shipwrecks: 21 November 1836
Ship	State	Description
Aurora	United Kingdom	The ship ran aground on the Redcar Rocks, in the North Sea and was damaged. She was on a voyage from Newcastle upon Tyne, Northumberland to Wivenhoe, Essex. Aurora was later refloated and taken in to Harwich, Essex.
Bristol	United Kingdom	The ship was wrecked near New York, United States with some loss of life. She was on a voyage from Liverpool, Lancashire to New York.

== 22 November ==
List of shipwrecks: 22 November 1836
Ship	State	Description
Caroline	United Kingdom	The ship ran aground on the Lapsand, off the coast of Denmark. She was on a voyage from Saint Petersburg, Russia to London. Caroline was refloated on 25 November and resumed her voyage.
Clarence	United Kingdom	The ship ran aground on the Lapsand. She was on a voyage from Riga, Russia to London. Clarence was later refloated and resumed her voyage.
Elizabeth	United Kingdom	The ship foundered in the Bristol Channel.
Friends	United Kingdom	The sloop was wrecked near Formby, Lancashire.
Keith	United Kingdom	The ship was wrecked at "Piso". Her crew were rescued.
Neptune	United Kingdom	The ship was driven ashore and wrecked at Plymouth, Devon. She was on a voyage from Weymouth, Dorset to Plymouth.
Percival	United Kingdom	The ship ran aground on the Lapsand. She was on a voyage from Riga to London. Percival was refloated on 1 December but had to be beached and was condemned. She was refloated again on 4 February 1837 and taken into Helsingør, Denmark.
Thomas	United Kingdom	The schooner capsized in the River Mersey off Hoylake, Cheshire with the loss of one of her three crew. She was on a voyage from Ramsey, Isle of Man to Liverpool, Lancashire. Survivors were rescued by the Hoylake Lifeboat. Thomas subsequently camed ashore at New Brighton, Cheshire and was wrecked.
William and Joseph	United States	The ship ran aground on the Nantucket Shoals, off the coast of Massachusetts. She was on a voyage from Jamaica to New York.

== 23 November ==
List of shipwrecks: 23 November 1836
Ship	State	Description
Atlas	United Kingdom	The ship departed from Newport, Monmouthshire for Youghal, County Cork. No further trace, presumed foundered with the loss of all hands.
Betsey	United Kingdom	The ship foundered in the Humber. Her crew were rescued. She was refloated on 27 November and taken in to Grimsby, Lincolnshire in a severely damaged condition.
Blessing	United Kingdom	The ship was driven ashore and wrecked at Great Yarmouth, Norfolk. Her crew were rescued. She was on a voyage from London to South Shields, County Durham.
Britannia; Jane	(United Kingdom of Great Britain and Ireland) Jersey; United Kingdom	The smack Britannia collided with the schooner Jane, ran aground and was severely damaged on the Doom Bar, Padstow, Cornwall with the loss of her captain. Three survivors were rescued by Dew Drop (United Kingdom). Jane was lost on the Doom Bar with the loss of all six or seven hands. Britannia was on a voyage from Jersey, Channel Islands to Milford Haven, Pembrokeshire. Britannia was refloated on 24 November but had to be beached due to damage sustained.
Brothers	United Kingdom	The ship was driven ashore near Wells-next-the-Sea, Norfolk. Her crew were rescued.
Carl Frederick	Flag unknown	The ship was abandoned in the North Sea off the Galloper Sandbank. She was on a voyage from "Schien" to Calais, France.
Ceres	Danzig	The brig was driven ashore on the Sunk Sand, in the Humber. She was on a voyage from Danzig to Hull, Yorkshire, United Kingdom.
Croft	United Kingdom	The ship was driven ashore at Warkworth, Northumberland. Her crew were rescued.
Edward	United Kingdom	The ship ran aground and capsized at Sligo. She was on a voyage from Limerick to Sligo.
Friends	United Kingdom	The sloop was wrecked near Formby, Lancashire.
Gazelle	United Kingdom	The paddle steamer ran aground on the Skitter Sand, in the North Sea off the coast of Yorkshire. She was on a voyage from Hull, Yorkshire to London. Gazelle was later refloated and resumed her voyage.
Heber	United Kingdom	The ship ran aground on the Bath-house Shoal, in the North Sea off the coast of Suffolk and was damaged. She was refloated and taken in to Lowestoft, Suffolk.
Hind	United Kingdom	The ship was driven ashore and wrecked at Aberdeen. Her crew were rescued. She was on a voyage from Aberdeen to Newcastle upon Tyne, Northumberland.
Industry	United Kingdom	The ship foundered in the North Sea off the mouth of the Humber. Her crew were rescued.
Jasper	(United Kingdom of Great Britain and Ireland)	The sloop was driven ashore on the coast of Northumberland. Her crew were rescued. She was on a voyage from St. Andrews, Fife to Newcastle upon Tyne. Jasper was refloated on 8 December and taken in to Newcastle upon Tyne.
Kronprinz Frederick	Norway	The ship foundered off the Dutch coast. Her crew were rescued. She was on a voyage from Dram to London.
Providence	United Kingdom	The ship was driven ashore at the mouth of the River Avon.
Queen	United Kingdom	The ship struck the Trinity Sand and sank. Her crew were rescued. She was on a voyage from Sunderland, County Durham to Hull.
Shannon	United Kingdom	The sloop was driven ashore and sank at Milford Haven, Pembrokeshire. She was refloated on 24 November.
Susannah	United Kingdom	The ship foundered off Hartland Point, Devon.
Thankful	United Kingdom	The ship was wrecked on the Corton Sand in the North Sea off the coast of Suffolk. Her crew survived. She was on a voyage from Antwerp, Belgium to Hull.
Traveller	United Kingdom	The ship was driven ashore on Spurn Point, Yorkshire. She was on a voyage from Middlesbrough, Yorkshire to London.
Wilhelmina Gezina	Netherlands	The ship was wrecked on the Goodwin Sands, Kent, United Kingdom. Her crew survived. She was on a voyage from Rio de Janeiro, Brazil to Amsterdam, North Holland.
Zion Hill	United Kingdom	The ship was driven ashore and wrecked near Whitstable, Kent. She was on a voyage from London to Newport, Monmouthshire.

== 24 November ==
List of shipwrecks: 24 November 1836
Ship	State	Description
Chase	United Kingdom	The ship was driven ashore on Møn, Denmark. Her crew were rescued. She was on a voyage from Saint Petersburg, Russia to London. Chase was refloated on 6 December and towed in to Copenhagen, Denmark.
Industry	United Kingdom	The ship foundered in the North Sea off the mouth of the Humber. Her crew were rescued. She was on a voyage from Boston, Lincolnshire to Glasgow, Renfrewshire.
Kelso	United Kingdom	The ship was wrecked on Pico Island, Azores. Her crew were rescued. She was on a voyage from New Orleans, Louisiana to Liverpool, Lancashire.
Margaret	United Kingdom	The brig was driven ashore at Sunderland, County Durham. She was refloated on 1 December and taken in to Sunderland.
Michael	United Kingdom	The ship departed from Maryport, Cumberland for Jamaica. Presumed foundered with the loss of all hands as her boat came ashore in the Water of Urr.
Morning Star	United Kingdom	The ship was driven ashore at Aberdyfi, Cardiganshire.
Neptunus	Sweden	The ship was wrecked off Goree, Zeeland, Netherlands. Her crew were rescued by Sir Edward Banks (United Kingdom). Neptunus was on a voyage from Gamla Carleby to Marseille, Bouches-du-Rhône, France.
Reivilla	United Kingdom	The ship departed from Waterford for London. No further trace, presumed foundered with the loss of all hands.
Sarah	United Kingdom	The sloop was driven ashore at Sunderland.
Sarah	United Kingdom	The ship struck the Inner Dowsing Sand, in the North Sea. She was consequently beached at Brancaster, Norfolk. Sarah was refloated on 14 December and taken in to King's Lynn, Norfolk.
Twee Gebroedey	Danzig	The ship was driven ashore at Stettin. Her crew were rescued. She was on a voyage from Danzig to Antwerp, Belgium.
Twe Gebroeders	Belgium	The ship was driven ashore at Petten, North Holland, Netherlands. Her crew were rescued. She was on a voyage from Danzig to Antwerp.

== 25 November ==
List of shipwrecks: 25 November 1836
Ship	State	Description
Carl Frederick	Flag unknown	The ship was abandoned in the North Sea. Her crew were rescued. She was on a voyage from "Schien" to Calais, France.
Dudgeon Tender	United Kingdom	The tender was driven ashore at Wells-next-the-Sea, Norfolk.
Flora	United Kingdom	The ship departed from the Eider Canal. No further trace, presumed foundered in the North Sea with the loss of all hands. She was on a voyage from Lübeck to Rochester, Kent.
Halo	United Kingdom	The ship was driven ashore at Hook of Holland, South Holland, Netherlands. Her crew were rescued. She was on a voyage from Rouen, Seine-Inférieure, France to Sunderland, County Durham.
Liefde	Netherlands	The ship was abandoned in the North Sea. Her crew were rescued by Dove (United Kingdom). Liefde was on a voyage from Riga, Russia to Amsterdam, North Holland.
Onternehming	Belgium	The ship departed from Texel, North Holland for Antwerp. No further trace, presumed foundered with the loss of all hands.
Sarah	United Kingdom	The ship was driven ashore and damaged at Burnham Overy Staithe, Norfolk with the loss of a crew member. She was on a voyage from Memel, Prussia to Wisbech, Cambridgeshire. Sarah was refloated in mid-December and taken in to King's Lynn, Norfolk.

== 26 November ==
List of shipwrecks: 26 November 1836
Ship	State	Description
Children's Adventure	United Kingdom	The ship was driven ashore and severely damaged at Lowestoft, Suffolk.
Consort	United Kingdom	The ship was driven ashore near Nyborg, Denmark. She was on a voyage from Hull, Yorkshire to Korsør, Denmark. She had been refloated by 21 December.
Eliza	United Kingdom	The ship was abandoned in the Atlantic Ocean (44°40′N 43°30′W). Her crew were rescued by Duchess d'Orleans (United States).
Harmonia	France	The ship foundered in the North Sea off Ameland, Friesland, Netherlands. She was on a voyage from Saint Petersburg, Russia to Rouen, Seine-Inférieure.
Mary Ann Bertha	United Kingdom	The ship was driven ashore near Copenhagen, Denmark. She was on a voyage from Hull, Yorkshire to Memel, Prussia.
Nancy	United Kingdom	The ship was driven ashore at Lowestoft.
Neilson	United Kingdom	The ship collided with Orus and ran aground in the River Wear near Sunderland, County Durham.
Neptune	Norway	The ship was wrecked on the Hinder Bank, in the North Sea. Her crew were rescued by the steamship Sir Edward Banks (United Kingdom).
Perceval	United Kingdom	The ship was driven ashore at Helsingør, Denmark. She was on a voyage from Riga, Russia to London. Percevalwas refloated but came ashore again and sank.
William	United Kingdom	The ship was wrecked on the Miguelan Rocks. Her crew were rescued. She was on a voyage from Quebec City, Lower Canada, British North America to Sunderland.

== 27 November ==
List of shipwrecks: 27 November 1836
Ship	State	Description
Cádiz	Spain	The ship was driven ashore in Castletown Bay, Isle of Man. Her crew were rescued. She was on a voyage from Cádiz to the Clyde.
Clarisse	France	The ship was driven ashore near New Orleans, Louisiana, United States. She was on a voyage from New Orleans to Marseille, Bouches-du-Rhône.
Rapid	United Kingdom	The brig struck the Kentish Knock and sank. Her crew were rescued by Ann Louisa (United Kingdom). She was on a voyage from Newcastle upon Tyne, Northumberland to Exmouth, Devon.
Rockingham	United States	The ship was driven ashore near New Orleans. She was on a voyage from New Orleans to Havre de Grâce, Seine-Inférieure, France.
Seventh of September	Brazil	The brig was wrecked near Buenos Aires, Argentina.
Shawfield	United Kingdom	The smack foundered off the Copeland Islands, County Down. Her crew were rescued. She was on a voyage from Liverpool, Lancashire to Islay, Inner Hebrides.
York Packet	United Kingdom	The ship sank off Sunderland, County Durham.

== 28 November ==
List of shipwrecks: 28 November 1836
Ship	State	Description
Albion	United Kingdom	The ship was driven ashore at Teignmouth, Devon.
British Merchant	United Kingdom	The ship was driven ashore near Ramsgate, Kent.
Content	United Kingdom	The ship was driven ashore on Düne. She was on a voyage from Hamburg to Sunderland, County Durham. Content was refloated and put into the Elbe.
Prince George	United Kingdom	The ship was driven ashore near Ramsgate.
Superior	United States	The ship was wrecked on a reef off Bermuda. Her crew were rescued. She was on a voyage from Marseille, Bouches-du-Rhône, France to New York.

== 29 November ==
List of shipwrecks: 29 November 1836
Ship	State	Description
Acasta	United Kingdom	The ship was driven ashore and damaged at Ramsgate, Kent. Her crew were rescued. She was on a voyage from British Honduras to London. Acasta was refloated on 9 December and taken in to Ramsgate.
Amathea	Hamburg	The ship foundered in the Gulls. She was refloated on 19 December and beached at Kingsgate, Kent, where she was wrecked on 24 December.
Anna Margaretha	United Kingdom	The ship was driven ashore at Falmouth, Cornwall.
Auguste	France	The ship was driven ashore at Brook, Isle of Wight. Her crew were rescued. She was on a voyage from Saint-Malo, Ille-et-Vilaine to Dunkirk, Nord.
Bensley	United Kingdom	The ship was driven ashore at Newport, Monmouthshire.
Betsey Black	United Kingdom	The ship was driven ashore at Sheerness, Kent. She was later refloated.
Blenheim	United Kingdom	The ship was wrecked on the Abo Tiller Bank, in the Baltic Sea off Nakskov, Denmark. Her crew were rescued. She was on a voyage from Saint Petersburg, Russia to London. Blenheim was refloated on 22 December and towed into Alboe, Sweden.
Bragela	United Kingdom	The ship was driven ashore at Falmouth.
Branken	United Kingdom	The ship was driven ashore and wrecked in Sandwich Bay. Her crew were rescued. She was on a voyage from London to Rio de Janeiro, Brazil. Branken was refloated on 30 November and taken in to Ramsgate.
Catharine	United Kingdom	The ship was destroyed by fire at Newport.
City of Edinburgh	United Kingdom	The ship was driven ashore in Bovisand Bay. She was on a voyage from London to Sydney, New South Wales. City of Edinburgh was refloated on 1 December and taken in to the Cattewater.
Commodore	United Kingdom	The ship was driven ashore at Newport.
Congo	United Kingdom	The ship was driven ashore at Bristol, Gloucestershire.
Cora Julie	France	The ship was driven ashore at Broadstairs, Kent. She was on a voyage from New York, United States to Havre de Grâce, Seine-Inférieure. Cora Julie was consequently condemned.
Ebenezer	United Kingdom	The ship sank in the River Thames. Her crew were rescued.
Eliza	United Kingdom	The sloop was driven ashore and wrecked at St. Andrews, Fife.
Elizabeth	United Kingdom	The brig was driven ashore at Landguard Fort, Suffolk. She was on a voyage from Newcastle upon Tyne, Northumberland to Havre de Grâce. Elizabeth was later refloated and taken in to Harwich, Essex.
Elizabeth	United Kingdom	The ship sank at Harwich.
Emile	France	The ship was driven ashore near Berck, Pas-de-Calais. She was on a voyage from Rouen, Seine-Inférieure to Bayonne, Basses-Pyrénées.
Emma	United Kingdom	The sloop was driven ashore and wrecked at St Mawes Castle, Falmouth.
Emilie	France	The ship was driven ashore at Berck, Pas-de-Calais, France. She was on a voyage from Rouen to Bayonne, Basses-Pyrénées.
Excellent	United Kingdom	The ship was driven ashore at Northam, Devon. She was on a voyage from Swansea, Glamorgan to Fowey, Cornwall.
Fame	United Kingdom	The ship ran aground on the Zuidwal, in the Wadden Sea. She was on a voyage from London to Harlingen, Friesland, Netherlands.
Fancy	United Kingdom	The schooner was abandoned in The Downs. Her crew were rescued. She was on a voyage from Leith, Lothian to Rio de Janeiro, Brazil and Sydney, New South Wales. Fancy was subsequently taken in to Boulogne, Pas-de-Calais, France.
Fortroendet	Sweden	The ship capsized in the English Channel off Portland Bill, Dorset, United Kingdom. She was on a voyage from Gothenburg to Portsmouth, Hampshire, United Kingdom. Fortroendet was later righted and towed in to Portsmouth.
Fortuna	Prussia	The ketch was driven ashore and wrecked on the Sandwich Flats, Kent. Her crew were rescued by the Deal boat Po (United Kingdom). She was on a voyage from Stralsund to Liverpool, Lancashire, United Kingdom.
Frederick	Belgium	The ship was driven ashore in the Scheldt at Antwerp. She was later on a voyage from Antwerp to Lisbon, Portugal. Frederick was later refloated.
Henrietta	United Kingdom	The ship was driven ashore and wrecked at Bideford, Devon. Her crew were rescued by the Bideford Lifeboat. She was on a voyage from Swansea to Plymouth, Devon.
Homas	Portugal	The ship was driven ashore and wrecked at Cowes, Isle of Wight, United Kingdom.
Iduna	Denmark	The schooner collided with Elijah (United Kingdom) and was beached at Cowes. She was refloated on 6 December and taken in to Cowes for repairs.
Industry	United Kingdom	The ship was driven ashore in Stonehouse Pool, Devon.
Islornas	Portugal	The ship was driven ashore and wrecked near Cowes, Isle of Wight, United Kingdom.
Jane	United Kingdom	The ship was driven ashore south of Sea Palling, Norfolk. She was on a voyage from Great Yarmouth, Norfolk to South Shields, County Durham.
Joane D'Arc	France	The ship was driven ashore near Folkestone, Kent. Her crew were rescued.
Jonge Adriana	Netherlands	The ship was driven ashore near Hellevoetsluis, Zeeland. She was on a voyage from Rotterdam, South Holland to Batavia, Netherlands East Indies. Jonge Adriana was refloated on 16 December and taken in to Hellevoetsluis.
Lavinia	United Kingdom	The smack capsized off Wivenhoe, Essex. Her crew were rescued. She was on a voyage from Wivenhoe to London.
Linnet	United Kingdom	The ship was driven ashore and damaged at Harwich.
Maddison	United Kingdom	The ship was driven ashore near Hellevoetsluis. She was on a voyage from Rotterdam to New York. Maddison was later refloated and taken in to Hellevoetsluis.
Margareta	Kingdom of Hanover	The ship was lost in the Ems. She was on a voyage from Hooksiel to Antwerp, Belgium.
Maria Anne	France	The ship was wrecked near Folkestone. She was on a voyage from Cette, Hérault to Havre de Grâce, Seine-Inférieure.
Marina	United Kingdom	The ship was driven ashore at Bristol.
Minerva	United Kingdom	The ship was driven ashore and damaged in Stokes Bay. She was later refloated.
Nicholas Witzen	Netherlands	The ship was damaged on the Arrow Bank, in The Solent. She was consequently beached at Portsmouth, Hampshire, United Kingdom.
Rosina	United Kingdom	The smack was driven ashore and wrecked at Harwich.
Seahorse	United Kingdom	The ship was driven ashore at Harwich.
Star	United Kingdom	The ship was driven ashore at Dartmouth, Devon. She was refloated an put into Torquay.
Superior	United States	The ship foundered off Bermuda. She was on a voyage from Marseille, Bouches-du-Rhône, France to New York.
Sylvia	United Kingdom	The ship was driven ashore at Newport.
Teutonia	Hamburg	The ship was wrecked at Ringkøbing, Denmark. Her crew were rescued. She was on a voyage from Rouen to Hamburg.
Victoria	flag unknown	The ship was driven ashore and wrecked near Bremen. She was on a voyage from Saint Petersburg to Bremen.
Violet	United Kingdom	The ship collided with West Indian and was then driven ashore at St Mawes Castle, Cornwall.

== 30 November ==
List of shipwrecks: 30 December 1836
Ship	State	Description
Chieftain	United Kingdom	The steamship ran aground on the Caloot Bank, in the North Sea off the coast of Zeeland, Netherlands. She was on a voyage from Hamburg to London. Chieftain was refloated on 8 December and towed in to Middelburg, Zeeland.
Economy	United Kingdom	The Humber Keel capsized in the North Sea off Grimsby, Lincolnshire. All three people on board survived.
Henry	United Kingdom	The Humber Keel sank near Brough, Yorkshire with the loss of nine lives. She was on a voyage from Leeds, Yorkshire to Hull, Yorkshire.
Houwina	Belgium	The ship ran aground on the Caloot Bank. She was on a voyage from Riga, Russia to Antwerp.
Justinian	United Kingdom	The ship was driven ashore on Sunk Island, Yorkshire. She was on a voyage from Riga to Hull. Justinian was refloated on 4 December.
Marie Anne	France	The ship ran aground off Dungeness, Kent, United Kingdom and was abandoned by her crew. She was on a voyage from Cette, Hérault to Havre de Grâce, Seine-Inférieure. Marie Anne was scuttled on 2 December.
Rochester Castle	United Kingdom	The ship ran aground at Blyth, Northumberland. She was on a voyage from Blyth to London.
Snowdrop	United Kingdom	The ship foundered in The Swin, off the coast of Essex.
Verwagting	Belgium	The ship was wrecked on the Rammekins, off the coast of Zeeland. She was on a voyage from Riga to Ostend, West Flanders.

== Unknown date ==
List of shipwrecks: Unknown date in November 1836
Ship	State	Description
Abeona	United Kingdom	The brig was wrecked at Cap-Rouge, Quebec City, Lower Canada, British North America before 8 November. She was on a voyage from London to Quebec City.
Adolpho	France	The ship was wrecked near Dénia, Spain. She was on a voyage from Marseille, Bouches-du-Rhône to St. Jago de Cuba, Cuba.
Africanus	United Kingdom	The ship was wrecked at Tamatave, Madagascar between 15 and 18 November.
America	United Kingdom	The ship was wrecked on the Florida Keys. She was on a voyage from New York to Mobile, Alabama.
Ann	United Kingdom	The ship was lost near Saint Petersburg, Russia. She was on a voyage from Liverpool, Lancashire to Saint Petersburg.
Anna Elizabeth	Flag unknown	The ship was driven ashore on Saaremaa, Russia.
Bonita	United Kingdom	The ship was driven ashore and severely damaged near Wells-next-the-Sea, Norfolk. She was later refloated and taken in to Blakeney, Norfolk.
Branch	United Kingdom	The brig was driven ashore on Saaremaa. Her crew were rescued. She was on a voyage from Riga, Russia to Dundee, Forfarshire. She was later refloated and put into Kuressaare.
Caroline	United Kingdom	The ship was driven ashore near Wells-next-the-Sea. She was later refloated.
Chatham	United Kingdom	The ship ran aground at the mouth of the Mississippi River before 24 November.
Eliza	United Kingdom	The ship was driven ashore at Memel, Prussia. She was on a voyage from Liverpool, Lancashire to Memel.
Entreprenant	France	The ship was driven ashore on the Île de Ré, Charente-Maritime. She was on a voyage from Newfoundland, British North America to Bordeaux, Gironde. Entreprenant was later refloated and taken in to La Flotte, Île de Ré.
Georgiana	United Kingdom	The ship departed from Sydney, Nova Scotia, British North America for South Shields, County Durham. No further trace, presumed foundered with the loss of all hands.
Graham	United Kingdom	The ship was driven ashore at Newbiggin-by-the-Sea, Northumberland. She was refloated on 6 November and taken in to Blyth, Northumberland.
Herman	Flag unknown	The ship was driven ashore and wrecked on Saaremaa.
Ica	United Kingdom	The ship was lost on the Bahama Banks before 24 November. She was on a voyage from Liverpool to Havana, Cuba.
Little Bray	United Kingdom	The ship was driven ashore at Bideford, Devon. She was on a voyage from Cardiff, Glamorgan to London. Little Bray was refloated on 21 November and taken in to Appledore for repairs.
Nyal Lyram	Russia	The ship was wrecked near Turku, Grand Duchy of Finland. She was on a voyage from Saint Petersburg to St. Ubes, Portugal.
Palmerston	United Kingdom	The ship was driven ashore and wrecked in the River Grendraeth.
Pomona	United Kingdom	The ship foundered off St. Ives, Cornwall. She was on a voyage from London to Limerick.
Providence	United Kingdom	The ship was driven ashore on East Point. She was on a voyage from Quebec City, Lower Canada to New Brunswick, British North America.
Pulmanter	United Kingdom	The ship was driven ashore in the River Loughor.
Sarah Ann	United Kingdom	The schooner was wrecked at Port Fairy, New South Wales.
Sion Hill	United Kingdom	The ship was wrecked on the Middle Ground, in the North Sea off the coast of Essex.
Star	United Kingdom	The ship was driven ashore at the mouth of the Danube.
William	United Kingdom	The ship foundered in the Irish Sea on or before 22 November. Her crew were rescued. She was on a voyage from Whitehaven, Cumberland to Kirkcudbright.
