= Värend =

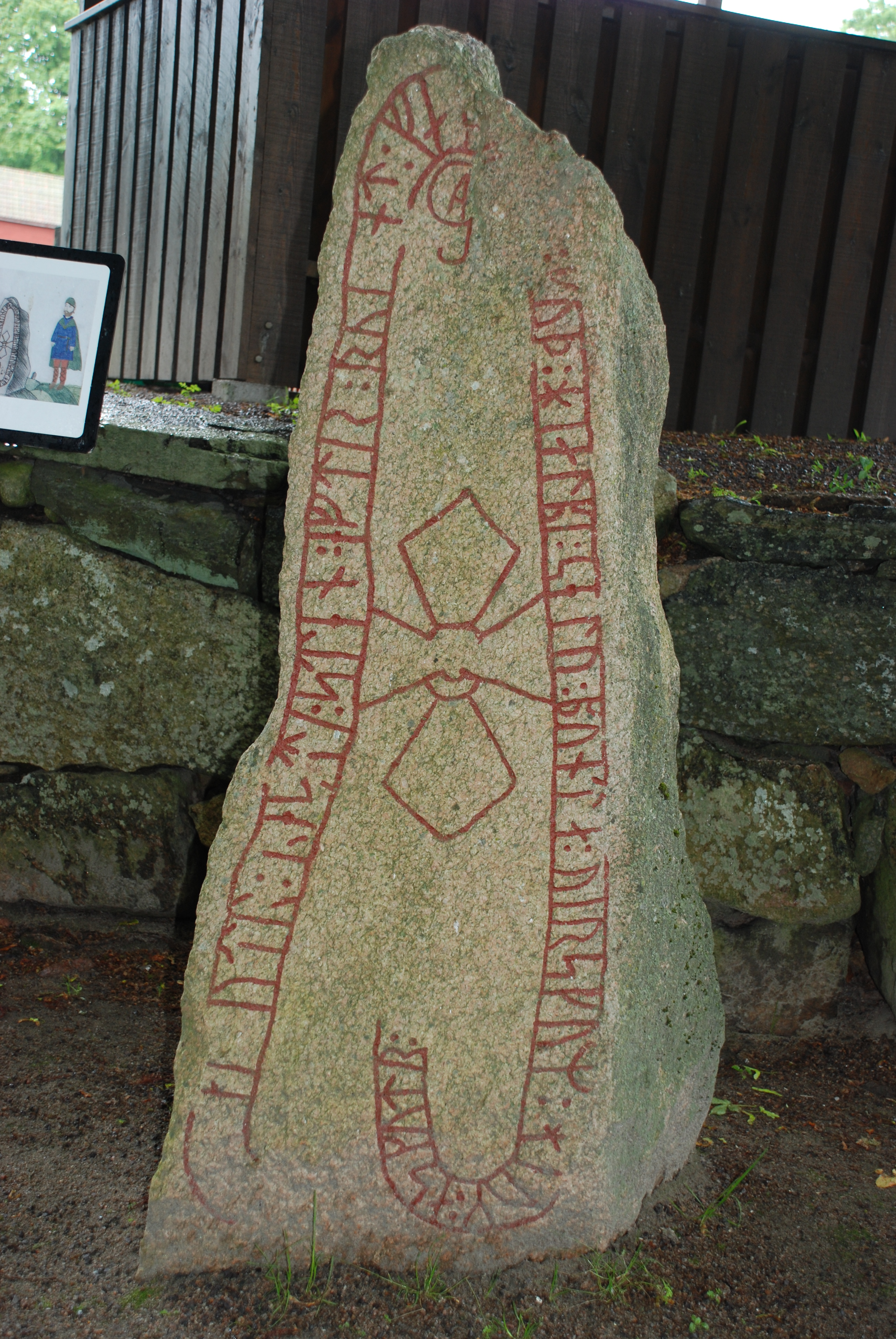
Runestone Sm 1 in Alvesta, saying that it was commissioned "bunta uirskum", for a Värend farmer.

Värend was in the Middle Ages the most populous of the constituent "small lands" of the province Småland, in Sweden. Early on, Växjö became its center. Around 1170, Värend broke out of the diocese of Linköping, and formed its own diocese of Växjö. Judicially, Värend was a part of "Tiohärad", which roughly corresponds to present-day Kronoberg County.

It consists of the hundreds, or härader, Allbo Hundred, Kinnevald Hundred, Konga Hundred, Norrvidinge Hundred and Uppvidinge Hundred.

== See also ==
- Blenda
- Warini
