= Blenda =

Heroine of a Swedish legend from Småland

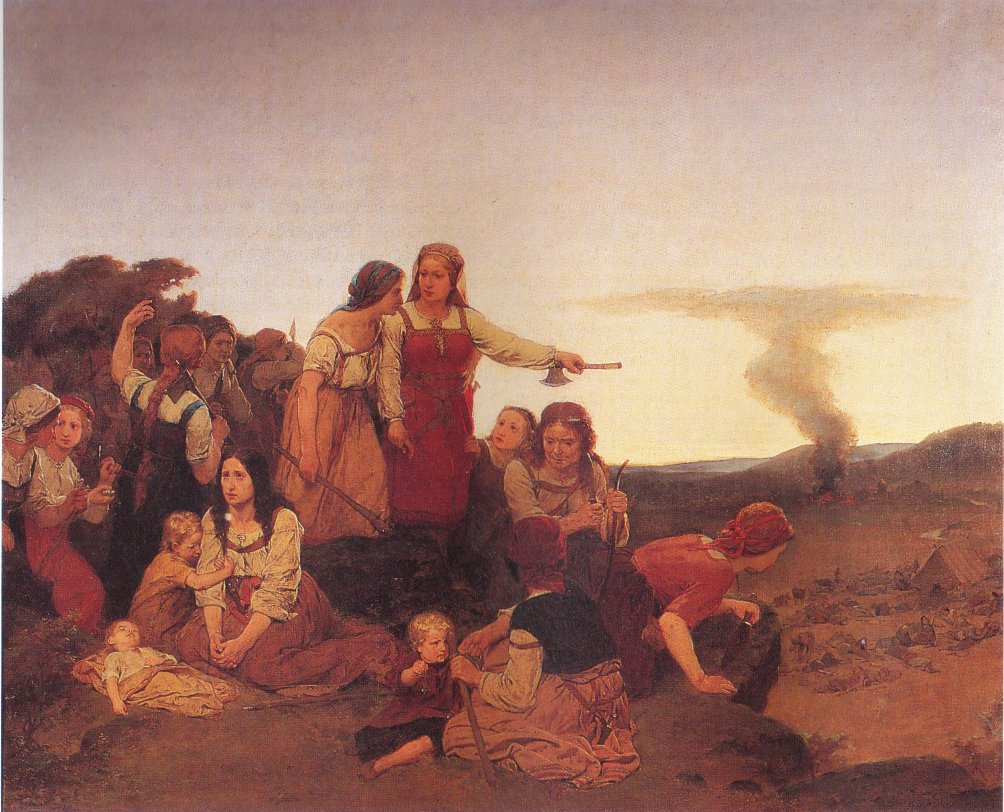
Blenda by August Malmström (1829-1901)

Blenda is the heroine of a Swedish legend (Blendasägnen) from Småland. Blenda led the rural women of Värend in an attack on a pillaging Danish army and annihilated the invaders.

== Legend ==
According to the legend, the events took place in the time of Alle (Anglo-Saxon Ælla), King of the Geats, when this king led the Geats in an attack against Norway. King Alle had marshalled not only the West Geats, but also the South Geats (or Riding Geats) of Småland, and so many men had left for Norway that the region was virtually defenseless.

When the Danes learned of Småland's precarious situation, they took advantage of it and attacked the defenseless small lands. Blenda was a woman of noble descent in the Konga Hundred and she decided to send the fiery cross to rally all the womenfolk in the hundreds of Konga, Albo, Kinnevald, Norrvidinge and Uppvidinge. The women armies assembled on the Brávellir, which according to Smålandish tradition is located in Värend and not in Östergötland.

The women approached the Danes and told them how much they were impressed with the Danish men. They invited the men to a banquet where they were provided with food and drink. After a long evening, the Danish warriors fell asleep and the women killed every single one of them with axes and staffs.

When King Alle returned, he bestowed new rights on the women. They acquired equal inheritance with their brothers and husbands, the right always to wear a belt around their waists as a sign of eternal vigilance, the right to beat the drum at weddings, and so forth. The five hundreds were combined into the land of Värend, which means the "defense", since it was a bulwark for Geatland. Blenda's village was called Värnslanda and a location near the battle ground was called Bländinge.

== Historicity ==
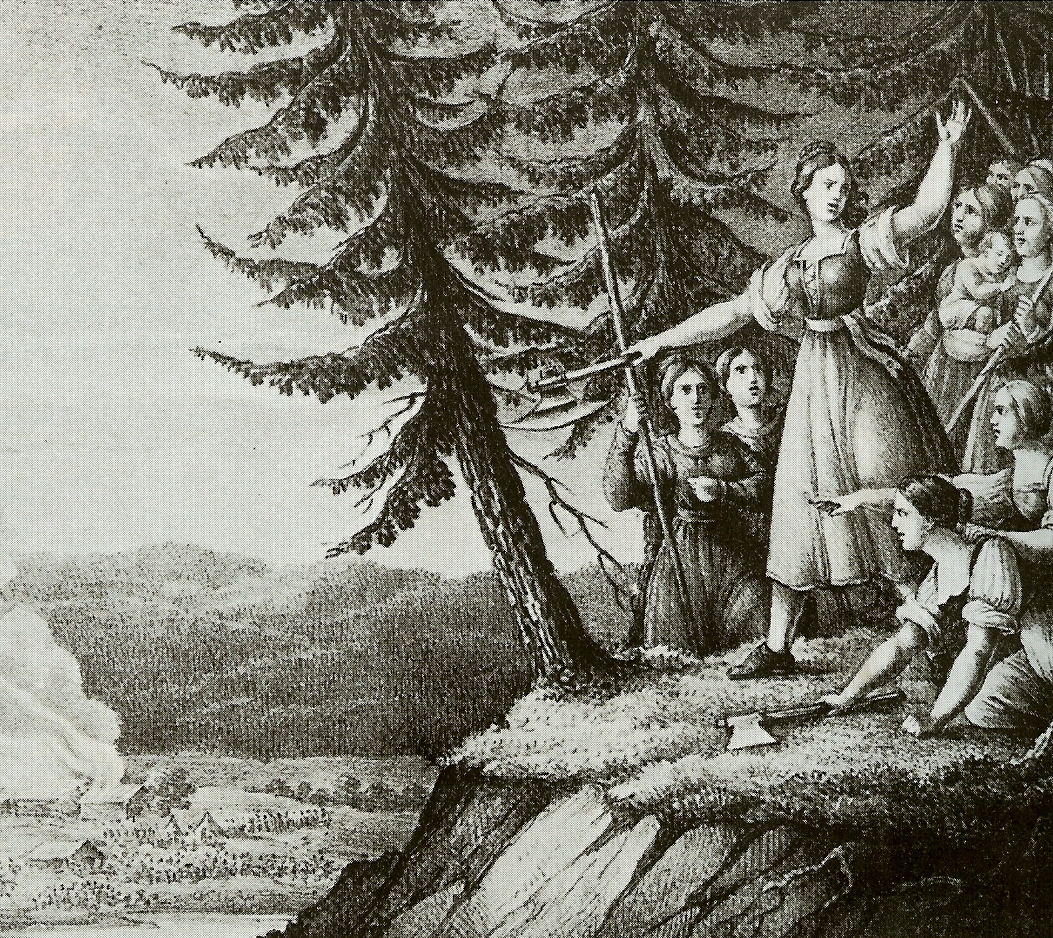
The Girls of Småland by Hugo Hamilton (1830)

The first printed text, where the legend has been connected with the inheritance rights, appeared in Johan Stiernhöök's De iure sueonum et gothorum vetusto (1672). He wrote that the inheritance rights were awarded by King Hakon Ring (Sigurd Hring) to the women after the Battle of Brávellir, in which they had shown valour against Harald Wartooth. The legend appears in embellished form in the various pleas made in the 1680s and 1690s in order to defend the equal inheritance and the Church's new prohibitions against church drums.

The final form probably comes from local historian, Petter Rudebeck (1660–1710) since both the oldest editions of it are reminiscent of Rudebeck's methodology and language. Petter Rudebeck gathered and wrote down peasant customs, practices, myths and legends of nearly every province of Småland. In 1813, the legend was rendered in the romantic poem Blenda in the first major poem by Erik Johan Stagnelius.

If the events did take place under the reign of King Alle, it would have happened about the year 500, which would make it less surprising, as female soldiers were allowed in Sweden before Christianity. So-called Shieldmaidens, three hundred female soldiers were recorded having served during the great Battle of Bråvalla (Slaget vid Bråvalla) in 750.

Several attempts have been made to support or discredit the legend's historicity. Some authors have proposed that it took place during the battles before the meeting of the three kings Inge I of Sweden, Magnus III of Norway and Eric I of Denmark at Kungahälla in 1101, or at the time of Sigurd I of Norway's attack on Kalmar in 1123. Sven Lagerbring (1707–1787) proposed that it would have taken place during King Sweyn III of Denmark's attack on Sweden in the 1150s. Olof von Dalin (1708–1763) conjectured that the event may have taken place in the 1270s when King Eric V of Denmark attacked Småland. Carl Johan Schlyter (1795–1888) suggested that the legend was invented to explain why the women of Värend had equal share in the inheritance with the men.

== Sources ==
- Nordisk familjebok (upplagan, 1905)
- Lagerbring, Sven Swea Rikes Historia: Ifrån De Äldsta Tider Til De Närwarande (1769)
- Henrikson, Alf Antikens historier: Rom (Albert Bonniers förlag, 1958) OCLC 185229027
- von Dalin, Olaf Svea rikes historia (Volumes 1–4, 1747–1762)
