= Results of the September 1914 Swedish general election =

Swedish election results

Sweden held a general election throughout September 1914.

== Results ==
The General Electoral League and Farmers' League had a tactical arrangement that saw all the votes for the latter land as Electoral League in the constituencies. Therefore, the Electoral League may correctly also be attributed 268,631 votes or 36.7%.

Party	Votes	%	Seats	+/–
General Electoral League	267,124	36.52	86	0
Swedish Social Democratic Party	266,133	36.39	87	+13
Free-minded National Association	196,493	26.87	57	–13
Farmers' League	1,507	0.21	0	New
Other parties	104	0.01	0	0
Total	731,361	100.00	230	0
Valid votes	731,361	99.44		
Invalid/blank votes	4,125	0.56		
Total votes	735,486	100.00		
Registered voters/turnout	1,111,767	66.15		
Source: Nohlen & Stöver

== Regional results ==
=== Percentage share ===
Land	Share	Votes	AV	S	F
Götaland	51.9	379,356	46.5	28.9	24.6
Svealand	31.5	230,429	27.3	46.4	27.2
Norrland	16.6	121,576	24.1	42.6	33.4
Total	100.0	731,361	36.7	36.4	26.9
Source: SCB

=== By votes ===
Land	Share	Votes	AV	S	F	Other
Götaland	51.9	379,356	176,388	109,697	93,212	59
Svealand	31.5	230,429	62,997	104,666	62,733	33
Norrland	16.6	121,576	29,246	51,770	40,548	12
Total	100.0	731,361	268,631	266,133	196,493	104
Source: SCB

== County results ==
After the dissolution of first-past-the-post, most counties retained multiple constituencies. This county list separates Stockholm and the namesake county since those were different counting areas.

=== Percentage share ===
Location	Land	Share	Votes	AV	S	F
Blekinge	G	2.1	15,652	45.7	30.0	24.3
Gothenburg-Bohus	G	5.9	44,500	42.0	31.4	26.6
Gotland	G	1.1	8,204	81.8	2.9	15.3
Gävleborg	N	4.6	34,761	17.6	58.2	24.2
Halland	G	2.7	20,536	59.1	19.9	20.9
Jämtland	N	2.3	17,586	21.8	31.0	47.2
Jönköping	G	4.2	32,258	55.1	19.8	25.1
Kalmar	G	3.8	29,049	59.4	19.5	21.1
Kopparberg	S	4.1	30,913	18.1	54.3	27.5
Kristianstad	G	4.4	33,499	33.2	32.2	34.7
Kronoberg	G	2.7	20,795	60.0	22.1	17.9
Malmöhus	G	7.8	59,616	34.7	47.2	18.0
Norrbotten	N	2.1	16,047	25.9	53.8	20.4
Skaraborg	G	4.5	34,131	43.4	21.4	35.2
Stockholm (city)	S	5.8	44,448	36.9	47.4	15.6
Stockholm County	S	3.5	26,923	37.3	42.9	19.8
Södermanland	S	3.5	26,878	21.6	47.9	30.5
Uppsala	S	2.6	19,571	31.7	39.1	29.2
Värmland	S	4.5	33,978	22.1	41.0	36.9
Västerbotten	N	2.8	21,392	33.4	17.6	49.0
Västernorrland	N	4.2	31,790	25.2	43.1	31.7
Västmanland	S	2.8	21,146	24.6	47.4	28.0
Älvsborg	G	5.5	41,512	50.7	19.7	29.6
Örebro	S	3.6	26,572	23.5	40.5	36.0
Östergötland	G	5.2	39,604	41.8	39.4	18.8
Total		100.0	731,361	36.7	36.4	26.9
Source: SCB

=== By votes ===
Location	Land	Share	Votes	AV	S	F	Other
Blekinge	G	2.1	15,652	7,154	4,701	3,797	
Gothenburg-Bohus	G	5.9	44,500	18,668	13,983	11,846	3
Gotland	G	1.1	8,204	6,708	236	1,258	2
Gävleborg	N	4.6	34,761	6,111	20,235	8,413	2
Halland	G	2.7	20,536	12,143	4,095	4,297	1
Jämtland	N	2.3	17,586	3,836	5,448	8,301	1
Jönköping	G	4.2	32,258	17,772	6,397	8,081	8
Kalmar	G	3.8	29,049	17,254	5,677	6,117	1
Kopparberg	S	4.1	30,913	5,590	16,800	8,515	8
Kristianstad	G	4.4	33,499	11,106	10,774	11,612	7
Kronoberg	G	2.7	20,795	12,474	4,592	3,727	2
Malmöhus	G	7.8	59,616	20,678	28,162	10,754	22
Norrbotten	N	2.1	16,047	4,151	8,628	3,267	1
Skaraborg	G	4.5	34,131	14,799	7,315	12,015	2
Stockholm (city)	S	5.8	44,448	16,415	21,086	6,939	8
Stockholm County	S	3.5	26,923	10,032	11,563	5,323	5
Södermanland	S	3.5	26,878	5,802	12,865	8,205	6
Uppsala	S	2.6	19,571	6,211	7,643	5,717	
Värmland	S	4.5	33,978	7,505	13,919	12,553	1
Västerbotten	N	2.8	21,392	7,143	3,765	10,481	3
Västernorrland	N	4.2	31,790	8,005	13,694	10,086	5
Västmanland	S	2.8	21,146	5,194	10,029	5,923	
Älvsborg	G	5.5	41,512	21,058	8,168	12,281	5
Örebro	S	3.6	26,572	6,248	10,761	9,558	5
Östergötland	G	5.2	39,604	16,574	15,597	7,427	6
Total		100.0	731,361	268,631	266,133	196,493	104
Source: SCB

== Results by city and district ==
=== Blekinge ===
Location	Share	Votes	AV	S	F
Bräkne	14.9	2,331	52.6	31.5	15.9
Karlshamn	5.1	803	42.3	32.6	25.0
Karlskrona	19.9	3,109	51.1	23.2	25.7
Lister	17.7	2,765	47.6	26.7	25.7
Medelstad	23.0	3,607	41.2	37.4	21.4
Ronneby	2.8	434	44.0	34.6	21.4
Sölvesborg	2.6	406	29.8	39.9	30.3
Östra	14.0	2,197	40.3	26.6	33.1
Total	2.1	15,652	45.7	30.0	24.3
Source: SCB

=== Gothenburg and Bohus ===
Location	Share	Votes	AV	S	F
Askim	5.4	2,409	38.5	42.8	18.8
Bullaren	0.8	341	57.2	0.0	42.8
Gothenburg	41.2	18,324	34.7	42.4	22.9
Inlands Fräkne	1.4	642	46.1	10.3	43.6
Inlands Nordre	3.8	1,693	61.3	2.7	36.1
Inlands Södre	2.9	1,273	81.6	2.8	15.6
Inlands Torpe	1.4	601	34.8	40.8	24.5
Kungälv	0.5	232	59.1	23.3	17.7
Kville	1.8	822	42.9	18.5	38.6
Lane	2.5	1,100	59.5	8.6	31.9
Lysekil	1.0	459	56.0	29.2	14.8
Marstrand	0.5	227	40.1	3.1	56.8
Orust Västra	3.7	1,643	63.4	2.2	34.4
Orust Östra	1.8	781	44.8	7.6	47.6
Sotenäs	3.9	1,739	20.0	49.2	30.9
Strömstad	0.8	345	46.1	36.2	17.7
Stångenäs	2.7	1,195	55.4	29.2	15.4
Sävedal	6.2	2,781	33.0	49.5	17.5
Sörbygden	1.3	600	91.7	0.0	8.3
Tanum	2.1	923	51.7	12.9	35.3
Tjörn	2.4	1,075	29.0	1.6	69.3
Tunge	2.0	902	44.3	27.9	27.7
Uddevalla	3.2	1,421	30.3	36.0	33.7
Vette	3.1	1,370	24.4	40.9	34.7
Västra Hising	3.3	1,486	69.0	6.2	24.8
Östra Hising	0.3	116	88.8	4.3	6.9
Total	5.9	44,500	42.0	31.4	26.6
Source: SCB

=== Gotland ===
Location	Share	Votes	AV	S	F
Gotland Norra	41.2	3,380	82.9	2.9	14.2
Gotland Södra	49.1	4,028	81.9	2.0	16.0
Visby	9.7	796	76.1	7.2	16.7
Total	1.1	8,204	81.8	2.9	15.3
Source: SCB

=== Gävleborg ===
Location	Share	Votes	AV	S	F
Ala	8.9	3,088	13.6	65.5	20.9
Arbrå-Järvsö	5.6	1,951	16.8	54.4	28.8
Bergsjö-Forsa	10.9	3,795	16.7	57.3	26.0
Bollnäs ting	12.9	4,493	19.8	56.4	23.7
Delsbo	4.2	1,451	23.7	52.9	23.4
Enånger	2.4	840	18.2	51.5	30.2
Gästrikland Västra	13.7	4,773	14.9	56.5	28.6
Gästrikland Östra	15.2	5,268	10.8	66.1	23.0
Gävle	12.3	4,272	25.0	52.9	22.1
Hudiksvall	2.2	780	33.2	36.2	32.7
Ljusdal	7.5	2,622	15.1	61.4	23.5
Söderhamn	4.1	1,428	23.7	63.7	12.6
Total	4.6	34,761	17.6	58.2	24.2
Source: SCB

=== Halland ===
Location	Share	Votes	AV	S	F
Falkenberg	2.6	539	42.7	39.5	17.8
Faurås	13.2	2,718	72.4	7.6	20.0
Fjäre	12.9	2,646	81.1	7.5	11.4
Halmstad	8.8	1,805	40.7	37.0	22.3
Halmstad hundred	12.3	2,524	55.4	30.5	14.1
Himle	10.0	2,062	52.9	11.3	35.8
Hök	12.2	2,508	48.7	18.0	33.3
Kungsbacka	0.8	168	58.9	20.8	20.2
Laholm	1.4	288	46.9	31.3	21.9
Tönnersjö	9.2	1,896	40.8	40.9	18.2
Varberg	3.6	746	36.5	33.8	29.8
Viske	4.1	838	73.5	3.3	23.2
Årstad	8.8	1,798	81.0	9.7	9.3
Total	2.7	20,536	59.1	19.9	20.9
Source: SCB

=== Jämtland ===
Location	Share	Votes	AV	S	F
Berg	5.8	1,012	10.9	42.5	46.6
Hallen	2.5	433	17.6	21.7	60.7
Hammerdal	10.7	1,883	32.7	22.4	44.9
Hede	4.4	768	6.5	50.7	42.8
Lits-Rödön	16.4	2,876	26.4	27.4	46.2
Offerdal	7.0	1,230	15.1	26.5	58.4
Oviken	3.7	648	20.5	4.3	75.2
Ragunda	11.3	1,989	19.1	39.1	41.8
Revsund-Brunflo-Näs	16.9	2,972	16.4	38.7	44.9
Sunne	3.1	542	22.0	9.0	69.0
Sveg	6.8	1,192	11.9	51.3	36.8
Undersåker	5.5	960	26.5	22.2	51.4
Östersund	6.1	1,081	48.5	15.8	35.7
Total	2.3	17,586	21.8	31.0	47.2
Source: SCB

=== Jönköping ===
Location	Share	Votes	AV	S	F
Eksjö	2.2	723	38.2	30.2	31.7
Gränna	0.5	150	63.3	5.3	31.3
Huskvarna	3.3	1,063	31.8	45.2	23.0
Jönköping	11.2	3,601	41.1	31.2	27.7
Mo	4.4	1,427	70.4	5.7	23.9
Norra Vedbo	8.6	2,773	57.3	16.4	26.2
Nässjö	2.3	753	25.9	51.7	22.4
Södra Vedbo	6.6	2,123	57.5	22.6	19.8
Tveta	9.4	3,022	57.4	25.2	17.4
Vista	3.9	1,260	83.8	4.2	12.0
Västbo	15.6	5,034	63.5	14.4	22.1
Västra	10.1	3,245	58.2	13.2	28.6
Östbo	12.0	3,875	61.1	13.6	25.3
Östra	9.9	3,209	41.4	20.8	37.8
Total	4.2	32,258	55.1	19.8	25.1
Source: SCB

=== Kalmar ===
Location	Share	Votes	AV	S	F
Algutsrum	3.0	883	90.4	4.2	5.4
Aspeland	6.8	1,974	58.7	23.8	17.5
Borgholm	0.6	171	42.1	14.6	43.3
Gräsgård	2.3	664	73.6	11.7	14.6
Handbörd	7.0	2,041	56.5	25.9	17.5
Kalmar	5.4	1,557	55.9	22.5	21.5
Möckleby	1.7	498	98.2	0.2	1.6
Norra Möre	5.4	1,569	66.7	19.8	13.5
Norra Tjust	8.6	2,497	54.3	25.8	19.9
Oskarshamn	2.4	704	50.6	27.3	22.2
Runsten	2.5	719	90.4	1.4	8.2
Sevede	7.7	2,248	62.6	19.0	18.4
Slättbo	1.8	517	82.8	7.0	10.3
Stranda	6.0	1,750	54.9	23.7	21.4
Södra Möre	16.2	4,696	54.4	14.9	30.7
Södra Tjust	10.2	2,949	47.3	28.2	24.4
Tunalän	4.7	1,362	59.3	11.3	29.4
Vimmerby	1.1	331	59.8	15.4	24.8
Västervik	3.8	1,112	28.3	36.0	35.7
Åkerbo	2.8	807	86.7	2.0	11.3
Total	3.8	29,049	59.4	19.5	21.1
Source: SCB

=== Kopparberg ===
Location	Share	Votes	AV	S	F
Falu Norra	10.2	3,161	17.2	60.6	22.2
Falu Södra	10.1	3,122	17.1	55.6	27.3
Falun	4.4	1,345	36.5	35.5	28.0
Folkare	8.9	2,756	23.9	57.4	18.8
Gagnef	2.8	857	13.9	51.7	34.4
Hedemora	1.3	405	28.6	31.1	40.2
Hedemora ting	8.5	2,618	32.5	48.3	19.2
Leksand	8.7	2,694	10.5	49.7	39.8
Malung	5.8	1,800	8.5	52.0	39.1
Mora	7.5	2,328	7.7	55.7	39.6
Nås	6.5	2,003	19.1	60.1	20.8
Orsa	3.0	937	19.4	49.8	30.7
Rättvik	6.0	1,860	18.3	38.3	43.4
Särna-Idre	0.7	228	33.3	20.2	46.5
Säter	0.8	234	19.2	58.5	22.2
Västerbergslag	12.3	3,815	12.5	72.7	14.8
Älvdalen	2.4	750	21.5	46.0	32.5
Total	4.1	30,913	18.1	54.3	27.5
Source: SCB

=== Kristianstad ===
Location	Share	Votes	AV	S	F
Albo	4.8	1,606	17.4	29.0	53.6
Bjäre	6.3	2,104	71.1	15.6	13.4
Gärd	10.7	3,591	17.0	39.5	43.5
Hässleholm	1.1	365	42.7	32.6	24.7
Ingelstad	11.0	3,697	28.2	30.8	40.9
Järrestad	3.9	1,316	30.2	28.0	41.7
Kristianstad	4.1	1,388	48.0	27.3	24.7
Norra Åsbo	10.8	3,608	48.4	28.3	23.2
Simrishamn	1.0	330	41.2	36.4	22.4
Södra Åsbo	6.6	2,222	56.4	33.4	10.2
Villand	11.3	3,777	23.1	44.4	32.4
Västra Göinge	14.4	4,830	22.9	26.2	50.8
Ängelholm	1.7	565	43.7	48.5	7.8
Östra Göinge	12.2	4,100	26.8	35.3	37.9
Total	4.4	33,499	33.2	32.2	34.7
Source: SCB

=== Kronoberg ===
Location	Share	Votes	AV	S	F
Allbo	18.2	3,792	69.4	17.0	13.7
Kinnevald	11.7	2,424	74.4	14.1	11.5
Konga	18.3	3,805	55.5	28.9	15.6
Norrvidinge	6.3	1,308	67.4	20.3	12.4
Sunnerbo	25.0	5,194	61.0	15.7	23.3
Uppvidinge	16.0	3,321	41.3	36.0	22.7
Växjö	4.6	951	53.3	24.5	22.2
Total	2.7	20,795	60.0	22.1	17.9
Source: SCB

=== Malmöhus ===
Location	Share	Votes	AV	S	F
Bara	5.2	3,097	28.0	57.1	14.8
Eslöv	1.4	849	40.0	49.0	11.0
Frosta	6.3	3,769	31.8	22.8	45.3
Färs	5.3	3,171	22.0	26.9	51.1
Harjager	3.3	1,994	40.3	44.6	15.1
Herrestad	2.1	1,245	12.3	58.4	29.3
Hälsingborg	6.5	3,896	40.0	50.7	9.3
Landskrona	2.8	1,671	37.1	55.8	7.0
Ljunit	1.7	994	18.9	38.9	42.0
Luggude	14.0	8,336	35.9	50.3	13.8
Lund	3.3	1,962	44.2	42.5	13.3
Malmö	15.4	9,208	37.9	58.1	3.9
Onsjö	4.3	2,538	40.9	44.1	15.0
Oxie	6.5	3,861	28.6	58.9	12.5
Rönneberg	3.3	1,994	46.1	40.7	13.1
Skanör-Falsterbo	0.3	151	49.7	21.2	29.1
Skytt	3.5	2,089	43.6	34.6	21.8
Torna	5.2	3,077	37.7	41.6	20.7
Trälleborg	2.1	1,277	28.6	50.7	20.6
Vemmenhög	5.3	3,185	29.8	42.7	27.5
Ystad	2.1	1,252	30.9	57.8	11.1
Total	7.8	59,616	34.7	47.2	18.0
Source: SCB

=== Norrbotten ===
Location	Share	Votes	AV	S	F
Arjeplog	1.2	191	19.9	59.7	20.4
Arvidsjaur	4.5	719	21.0	66.8	12.2
Gällivare	11.0	1,773	23.8	68.9	7.3
Haparanda	0.9	147	53.7	17.0	29.3
Jokkmokk	1.9	299	26.1	57.2	16.7
Jukkasjärvi	8.2	1,318	12.5	80.3	7.2
Karesuando	0.1	18	100.0	0.0	0.0
Korpilombolo	0.8	122	23.8	44.3	32.0
Luleå	6.6	1,059	33.2	50.9	15.9
Nederkalix	9.3	1,490	29.5	54.6	15.8
Nederluleå	9.9	1,587	36.5	30.2	33.3
Nedertorneå	2.9	472	20.8	47.5	31.8
Pajala	1.4	221	38.9	43.0	18.1
Piteå	1.8	296	43.9	32.1	24.0
Piteå	14.4	2,308	25.9	46.0	28.1
Råneå	6.4	1,026	27.0	55.8	17.2
Älvsby	3.6	584	19.7	58.6	21.7
Överkalix	3.4	541	13.7	61.7	24.6
Överluleå	9.6	1,544	22.2	53.3	24.4
Övertorneå	2.1	332	24.1	37.3	38.6
Total	2.1	16,047	25.9	53.8	20.4
Source: SCB

=== Skaraborg ===
Location	Share	Votes	AV	S	F
Barne	5.8	1,981	52.9	6.6	40.5
Falköping	2.2	743	25.2	32.2	42.7
Frökind	1.2	411	83.5	2.2	14.4
Gudhem	4.8	1,643	43.9	21.2	34.9
Hjo	1.0	349	43.0	18.1	39.0
Kinne	5.4	1,837	23.0	29.4	47.6
Kinnefjärding	3.4	1,157	44.3	16.7	39.0
Kåkind	6.1	2,070	40.5	19.1	40.3
Kålland	5.2	1,782	48.5	13.6	37.8
Laske	2.7	907	40.4	10.5	49.2
Lidköping	3.0	1,017	32.3	41.6	26.2
Mariestad	2.1	710	38.0	27.3	34.6
Skara	2.0	699	35.3	25.6	39.1
Skåning	6.4	2,193	35.7	13.8	50.6
Skövde	2.9	984	42.2	27.2	30.5
Tidaholm	1.7	595	20.3	52.1	27.6
Vadsbo	19.8	6,770	41.0	27.0	32.0
Valle	2.0	698	35.0	30.8	34.2
Vartofta	11.6	3,968	56.1	23.6	20.3
Vilske	3.0	1,032	61.9	7.8	30.2
Viste	4.7	1,596	53.4	11.1	35.5
Åse	2.9	989	45.2	14.1	40.7
Total	4.5	34,131	43.4	21.4	35.2
Source: SCB

=== Stockholm ===
==== Stockholm (city) ====
Location	Share	Votes	AV	S	F
Stockholm	5.4	44,448	36.9	47.4	9.8
Total	5.4	44,448	36.9	47.4	9.8
Source: SCB

==== Stockholm County ====
Location	Share	Votes	AV	S	F
Bro-Vätö	2.1	568	56.0	35.2	8.8
Danderyd	10.7	2,868	32.7	48.5	18.7
Djursholm	2.1	576	63.5	21.7	14.8
Färentuna	3.5	930	29.7	41.9	28.4
Frösåker	7.0	1,880	40.3	43.8	15.9
Frötuna-Länna	3.5	950	66.8	18.6	14.4
Lyhundra	3.0	806	64.5	24.8	10.7
Långhundra	2.7	726	44.4	31.8	23.8
Norrtälje	2.0	527	53.3	34.2	12.5
Närdinghundra	4.9	1,327	35.4	34.6	30.0
Seminghundra	2.2	603	47.3	27.2	25.5
Sigtuna	0.2	61	57.4	8.2	34.4
Sjuhundra	3.0	812	35.5	48.3	16.1
Sollentuna	10.6	2,855	17.2	63.0	19.8
Sotholm	6.2	1,693	27.3	46.5	26.2
Svartlösa	8.9	2,391	34.2	48.8	16.9
Södertälje	5.6	1,500	30.7	55.4	13.9
Vallentuna	2.4	639	35.8	51.0	13.1
Vaxholm	1.6	422	45.7	12.8	41.5
Väddö-Häverö	3.7	998	60.8	33.0	6.2
Värmdö	3.8	1,025	44.7	33.2	22.1
Åker	2.5	684	35.4	32.6	32.0
Ärlinghundra	3.0	820	31.8	32.2	35.7
Öknebo	3.8	1,013	22.5	62.1	15.4
Öregrund	0.4	109	32.1	40.4	27.5
Östhammar	0.5	140	40.0	20.7	39.3
Total	3.5	26,923	37.3	42.9	19.8
Source:SCB

=== Södermanland ===
Location	Share	Votes	AV	S	F
Daga	4.9	1,316	37.0	39.4	23.6
Eskilstuna	16.6	4,474	18.1	62.6	19.3
Hölebo	3.3	899	23.0	48.5	28.5
Jönåker	9.5	2,561	16.1	55.8	28.0
Mariefred	0.7	192	34.4	37.5	28.1
Nyköping	5.7	1,540	24.1	61.2	14.7
Oppunda	21.3	5,718	17.1	45.6	37.3
Rönö	6.5	1,749	29.1	37.8	33.1
Selebo	3.2	849	34.4	43.1	22.4
Strängnäs	2.0	530	47.0	27.4	25.5
Torshälla	1.2	320	20.6	58.8	20.6
Trosa	0.5	138	31.9	49.3	18.8
Villåttinge	8.2	2,206	19.2	50.4	30.4
Västerrekarne	5.2	1,401	14.3	30.3	55.2
Åker	4.4	1,174	27.9	38.4	33.6
Österrekarne	6.7	1,811	19.5	35.7	44.7
Total	3.5	26,878	21.6	47.9	30.5
Source: SCB

=== Uppsala ===
Location	Share	Votes	AV	S	F
Bro	2.1	407	29.2	62.4	8.4
Bälinge	3.0	595	29.7	14.5	55.8
Enköping	3.5	680	47.1	36.8	16.2
Hagunda	3.8	753	32.5	22.6	44.9
Håbo	3.3	639	34.7	39.1	26.1
Lagunda	3.3	653	51.0	14.5	34.5
Norunda	5.1	996	23.6	33.5	42.9
Oland	17.1	3,341	21.9	43.2	34.9
Rasbo	2.6	513	36.1	18.5	45.4
Trögd	6.7	1,306	52.7	25.8	21.5
Ulleråker	3.7	717	33.9	30.0	36.1
Uppsala	18.4	3,606	41.5	36.5	22.0
Vaksala	2.5	498	44.2	25.3	30.5
Åsunda	3.9	772	60.5	16.6	22.9
Örbyhus	20.9	4,095	12.9	62.2	24.9
Total	2.6	19,571	31.7	39.1	29.2
Source: SCB

=== Värmland ===
Location	Share	Votes	AV	S	F
Arvika	2.2	737	29.2	39.6	31.2
Filipstad	2.0	667	28.8	35.4	35.8
Fryksdal	12.2	4,144	25.4	33.7	40.9
Färnebo	8.1	2,762	10.3	67.9	21.8
Gillberg	6.1	2,083	30.5	27.0	42.5
Grums	4.3	1,462	20.7	54.3	25.0
Jösse	9.7	3,301	22.8	39.4	37.9
Karlstad	5.0	1,702	30.7	31.0	38.3
Karlstad hundred	3.5	1,191	30.7	31.0	38.3
Kil	8.2	2,796	13.6	51.9	34.4
Kristinehamn	3.7	1,242	24.2	42.0	33.7
Nordmark	8.7	2,966	25.0	23.0	52.0
Nyed	2.7	908	23.5	29.1	47.5
Näs	4.9	1,654	35.5	21.8	42.7
Visnum	3.0	1,036	23.3	32.8	43.9
Väse	3.7	1,272	23.4	16.5	60.1
Älvdal	10.4	3,532	9.9	71.6	18.5
Ölme	1.5	523	44.9	13.4	41.7
Total	4.5	33,978	22.1	41.0	36.9
Source: SCB

=== Västerbotten ===
Location	Share	Votes	AV	S	F
Burträsk	6.3	1,344	48.2	19.8	32.0
Degerfors	5.0	1,067	17.6	23.3	59.0
Lycksele	8.4	1,788	23.4	13.3	63.3
Nordmaling-Bjurholm	8.3	1,769	28.7	10.4	60.9
Norsjö-Malå	5.1	1,099	30.7	34.3	35.0
Nysätra	10.8	2,307	30.8	17.3	51.9
Skellefteå	1.1	232	64.7	7.3	28.0
Skellefteå ting	26.2	5,609	51.5	14.1	32.6
Umeå	3.5	749	49.3	8.8	41.8
Umeå ting	18.3	3,909	15.9	19.0	65.1
Åsele	7.1	1,519	20.1	28.5	51.3
Total	2.8	21,392	33.4	17.6	49.0
Source: SCB

=== Västernorrland ===
Location	Share	Votes	AV	S	F
Boteå	5.0	1,581	22.7	56.6	20.7
Fjällsjö	4.6	1,447	18.4	65.4	16.2
Härnösand	2.4	760	51.3	15.3	33.4
Indal	3.0	942	20.4	46.1	33.5
Ljustorp	3.4	1,084	17.2	48.2	34.7
Medelpad Västra	15.0	4,771	18.4	47.5	34.1
Njurunda	3.8	1,214	14.0	67.4	18.6
Nordingrå	3.5	1,115	46.8	9.5	43.6
Nätra	8.1	2,563	26.0	24.4	49.6
Ramsele-Resele	5.7	1,815	23.8	58.1	18.1
Själevad-Arnäs	11.6	3,688	26.8	23.0	50.2
Skön	10.3	3,273	17.2	62.4	20.3
Sollefteå ting	4.9	1,573	28.6	56.5	14.9
Sundsvall	4.6	1,450	54.8	23.2	21.9
Ångermanland Södra N	4.3	1,356	28.3	27.5	44.2
Ångermanland Södra S	8.5	2,701	20.4	50.8	28.8
Örnsköldsvik	1.4	457	46.2	11.2	42.7
Total	4.2	31,790	25.2	43.1	31.7
Source: SCB

=== Västmanland ===
Location	Share	Votes	AV	S	F
Arboga	2.7	577	33.1	46.6	20.3
Gamla Norberg	10.2	2,149	12.3	65.5	22.2
Köping	3.5	740	30.7	43.1	26.2
Norrbo	4.4	935	18.7	59.1	22.1
Sala	3.9	831	33.2	26.4	40.4
Siende	2.9	608	26.3	45.4	28.3
Simtuna	6.5	1,381	37.7	27.7	34.5
Skinnskatteberg	5.6	1,185	11.8	65.5	22.7
Snevringe	12.4	2,616	16.8	59.2	24.0
Torstuna	3.4	711	47.1	26.3	26.6
Tuhundra	3.2	667	23.7	44.7	31.6
Vagnsbro	2.8	593	9.1	38.3	52.6
Våla	6.3	1,341	24.5	29.0	46.5
Västerås	12.8	2,716	28.8	55.9	15.3
Yttertjurbo	1.9	393	39.7	28.2	32.1
Åkerbo	12.8	2,715	24.6	45.0	30.4
Övertjurbo	4.7	988	32.3	33.1	34.6
Total	2.8	21,146	24.6	47.4	28.0
Source: SCB

=== Älvsborg ===
Location	Share	Votes	AV	S	F
Ale	5.0	2,068	50.1	22.0	27.9
Alingsås	1.6	661	35.7	26.9	37.4
Bjärke	2.0	814	31.8	11.2	57.0
Bollebygd	2.6	1,064	72.9	9.1	18.0
Borås	6.1	2,525	46.6	28.9	24.5
Flundre	2.3	963	27.5	53.8	18.7
Gäsene	4.7	1,958	59.3	5.0	35.6
Kind	12.1	5,030	57.9	7.4	34.7
Kulling	6.1	2,549	37.0	10.2	52.8
Mark	11.8	4,888	69.0	9.7	21.3
Nordal	3.1	1,290	30.5	31.6	37.7
Redväg	4.3	1,776	61.6	3.0	35.4
Sundal	2.8	1,168	78.9	5.8	15.2
Tössbo	2.4	999	41.6	22.3	36.0
Ulricehamn	0.9	371	40.2	16.7	43.1
Valbo	3.7	1,528	58.0	17.5	24.5
Vedbo	7.1	2,927	24.4	46.3	29.3
Veden	3.8	1,574	65.6	8.7	25.7
Väne	6.3	2,621	23.8	51.8	24.4
Vänersborg	1.8	755	42.8	24.4	32.8
Vättle	3.1	1,305	34.9	31.6	33.4
Åmål	1.6	675	33.2	46.2	20.6
Ås	4.8	2,003	84.4	2.6	13.0
Total	5.5	41,512	50.7	19.7	29.6
Source: SCB

=== Örebro ===
Location	Share	Votes	AV	S	F
Asker	5.8	1,532	12.8	30.6	56.5
Askersund	1.0	268	49.3	19.4	31.3
Edsberg	6.5	1,721	18.0	33.0	49.0
Fellingsbro	4.7	1,258	32.4	42.4	25.2
Glanshammar	3.1	825	22.8	22.1	55.2
Grimsten	4.1	1,097	17.1	45.9	37.0
Grythytte-Hällefors	3.5	923	18.4	71.2	10.4
Hardemo	1.6	419	31.0	22.9	46.1
Karlskoga hundred	7.7	2,048	23.4	52.1	24.3
Kumla hundred	10.8	2,874	25.0	31.4	43.5
Linde-Ramsberg	5.6	1,480	28.0	49.7	22.2
Lindesberg	1.2	327	36.1	37.9	26.0
Nora	1.3	344	41.6	31.7	26.7
Nora-Hjulsjö	5.1	1,352	19.3	51.9	28.8
Nya Kopparberg	4.9	1,309	16.3	66.9	16.8
Sköllersta	6.0	1,593	16.6	24.1	59.3
Sundbo	5.6	1,479	28.5	33.9	37.5
Örebro	13.0	3,465	27.0	43.1	29.9
Örebro hundred	8.5	2,258	24.6	35.6	39.8
Total	3.6	26,572	23.5	40.5	36.0
Source: SCB

=== Östergötland ===
Location	Share	Votes	AV	S	F
Aska	6.0	2,365	29.7	52.3	18.0
Bankekind	2.7	1,065	40.1	36.2	23.7
Björkekind	1.6	647	59.0	14.7	26.3
Boberg	3.2	1,269	47.5	37.4	15.1
Borg	0.9	337	44.2	47.8	8.0
Bråbo	1.5	602	27.7	62.0	10.3
Dal	1.9	734	43.6	43.7	12.7
Finspånga län	9.8	3,864	27.8	52.5	19.7
Gullberg	2.3	904	36.8	34.1	29.1
Göstring	6.3	2,479	39.7	46.2	14.1
Hammarkind	5.8	2,290	30.5	32.4	37.1
Hanekind	3.3	1,306	44.3	35.0	20.7
Kinda	7.0	2,766	42.2	32.8	25.0
Linköping	7.5	2,968	44.1	38.1	17.7
Lysing	4.4	1,725	60.6	24.9	14.4
Lösing	2.6	1,030	41.0	47.8	11.3
Memming	1.8	700	26.3	56.4	17.3
Motala	1.0	378	40.7	26.7	32.5
Norrköping	10.4	4,105	62.9	30.6	6.5
Skänninge	0.6	236	44.1	36.4	19.5
Skärkind	2.1	847	33.3	46.5	20.2
Söderköping	0.6	239	49.4	34.3	16.3
Vadstena	1.0	383	51.4	35.0	13.6
Valkebo	2.9	1,166	37.0	40.9	22.0
Vifolka	5.0	1,991	32.8	46.6	20.5
Ydre	2.9	1,133	45.5	34.0	20.5
Åkerbo	1.4	551	65.5	12.2	22.3
Östkind	2.3	909	46.8	26.5	26.7
Östra Eneby	1.6	615	32.7	59.3	8.0
Total	5.2	39,604	41.8	39.4	18.8
Source: SCB
