= Blenheim (1790 ship) =

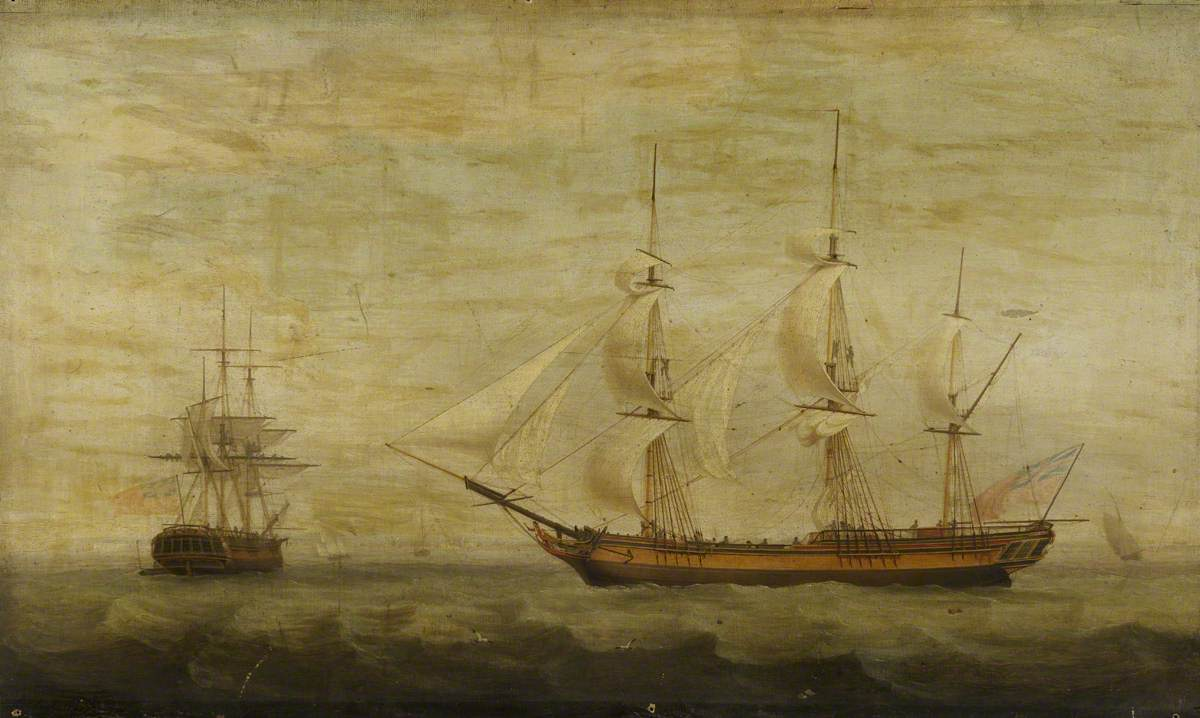
- The merchantman Blenheim of London

History

Great Britain
- Name: Blenheim
- Builder: Peter Everitt Mestaer, King and Queen Dock, Rotherhithe
- Launched: 27 July 1790
- Fate: Wrecked November 1836; last listed 1837

General characteristics
- Tons burthen: 360, or 369, or 381, or 382 (bm)

Blenheim was launched in 1790 as West Indiaman, and spent almost all of her career as a West Indiaman. In 1818 she made one voyage to Bengal under a license from the British East India Company (EIC). On her return from Bengal she reverted to the West Indies trade. Later she traded between London and Quebec. She was wrecked in November 1836 and refloated. She was last listed in 1837.

== Career ==
Blenheim entered Lloyd's Register (LR) in 1790 with G.Kitton, master, Fryer & Co., owner, and trade London–Jamaica.

Year	Master	Owner	Trade	Source
1795	T.Wilson	Fryer & Co.	London–Jamaica	LR
1800	J.Dodd; W.Merriton; F.Smith	H.Jackson; J.Slegg & Co.	London–Jamaica; London–Barbados	LR
1805	G.Miller	Long & Co.	London–Grenada	LR; small repairs 1801 & damages repaired 1802
1810	G.Miller	Long & Co.	London–Grenada	LR; small repairs 1801 & 1804; thorough repair 1809
1818	G.Miller; Wilson	Long & Co.	London–Grenada	LR; thorough repair 1810 and 1815

In 1813 the EIC had lost its monopoly on the trade between India and Britain. British ships were then free to sail to India under a license from the EIC.

Blenheim appeared on a list of licensed ships sailing to India in 1818. Blenheim, Shirley, master, sailed for Calcutta on 17 October.

Year	Master	Owner	Trade	Source
1820	Shirley; Smith	Long & Co.	London–Bengal; London–Grenada	LR; thorough repair 1815
1825	Smith	Long & Co.	London–Grenada	LR; thorough repair 1815 & small repairs 1823
1829	J.Hodnett; Frankland	Long & Co.	London–St Vincent	LR; thorough repair 1815 & small repairs 1823, 1826, & 1829
1830	J.Frankland	Long & Co.	London–Quebec	LR; thorough repair 1815 & small repairs 1823 & 1829
1835	Frankland			

In 1836 Blenheim's registry changed to Whitby. At that time her owners were James Terry, Francis Wilson, Henry Prescott, and Will Clarkson.

== Fate ==
Blenheim, Wilson, master, was wrecked on 29 November 1846, on the Abo Tiller Bank, in the Baltic Sea off Nakskov, Denmark. Her crew were rescued. She was on a voyage from Saint Petersburg, Russia to London. Blenheim was refloated on 22 December and towed into Alboe, Sweden.

Blenheim was last listed in 1837 with Wilson, master, J. Terry, owner, and trade London–Quebec.
