= Östergötland Runic Inscription 77 =

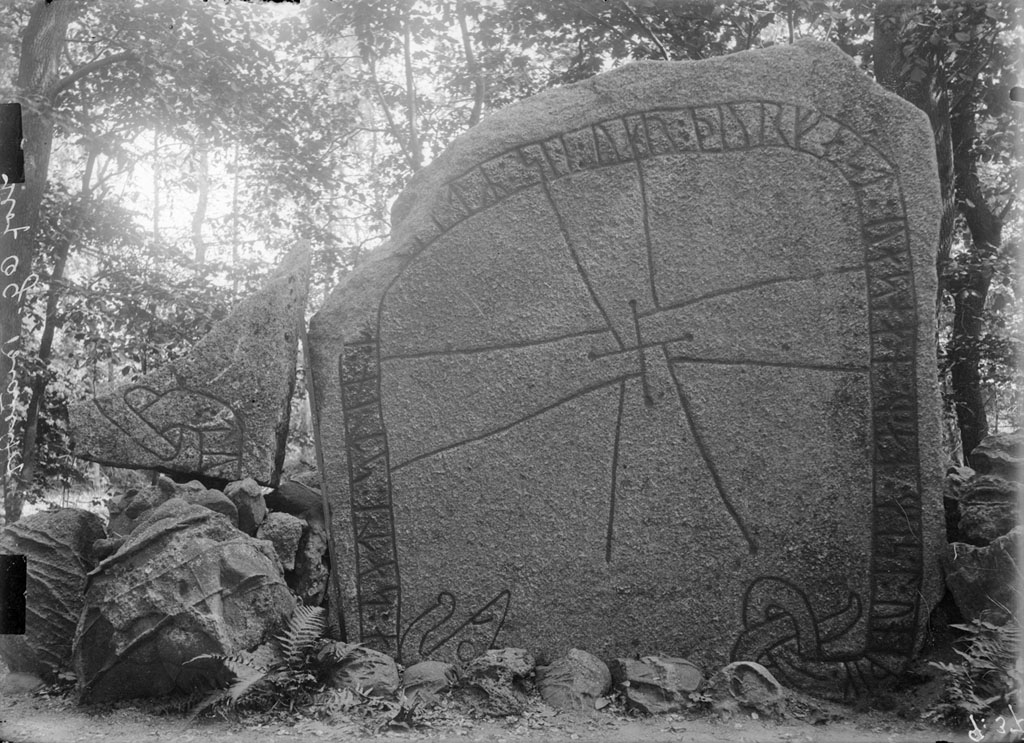
Photograph of the runestone taken in 1894 by Erik Brate.

Östergötland Runic Inscription 77 or Ög 77 is the Rundata catalog designation for a Viking Age memorial runestone located at Hovgården (Hov Synod), which is seven kilometers north of Väderstad, Östergötland County, Sweden, and in the historic province of Östergötland.

== Description ==
The inscription on Ög 77 has runic text carved in the younger futhark on a serpent that encircles a cross. The inscription is damaged and cannot be classified using the runestone styles developed by Anne-Sophie Gräslund in the 1990s as her classification system uses the depiction of the head of the serpent, which is missing on Ög 77. The stone was found in 1867 in the basement of a former royal family-owned building called the Kungslychan at Hovgården. Before the historic significance of runestones was recognized, they were often re-used as materials in the construction of churches, bridges, and roads. The stone, which had been broken in three pieces, was repaired and then raised just north of Hovgården.

The runic text on Ög 77 states that the stone was raised by a woman named either Tunna or Tonna in memory of her husband Þorfastr, who is described using the word óníðingr. Óníðingr, which with the ó- prefix means the opposite of the Old Norse pejorative word níðingr, was used to describe a man as being virtuous. Óníðingr is used as a descriptive word in some runic inscriptions and is translated in the Rundata database as "unvillainous." It is used as a descriptive term on inscriptions Sö 189 in Åkerby, Sm 5 in Transjö, Sm 37 in Rörbro, Sm 147 in Vasta Ed, and DR 68 in Århus, and appears as a name or part of a name on inscriptions Ög 217 in Oppeby, Sm 2 in Aringsås, and Sm 131 in Hjortholmen. The text on Ög 77, Sm 5, and Sm 37 use the same exact phrase, manna mæstr oniðingʀ or "most unvillainous of men" to describe the deceased, and DR 68 uses a variant of this phrase.

== Inscription ==
=== Transliteration of the runes into Latin characters ===
: tuna : sati : stin : þ-... --tʀ : sin : uar : þurfast : uas han : man : mist : uniþik *

=== Transcription into Old Norse ===
Tunna/Tonna satti stæin þ[annsi æf]tiʀ sinn ver Þorfast. Vas hann manna mæstr oniðingʀ.

=== Translation in English ===
Tunna/Tonna placed this stone in memory of her husband Þorfastr. He was the most unvillainous of men.
