= Aringsås Runestones =

Runestones in Alvesta, Sweden

Coordinates: 56.9010°N 14.5665°E

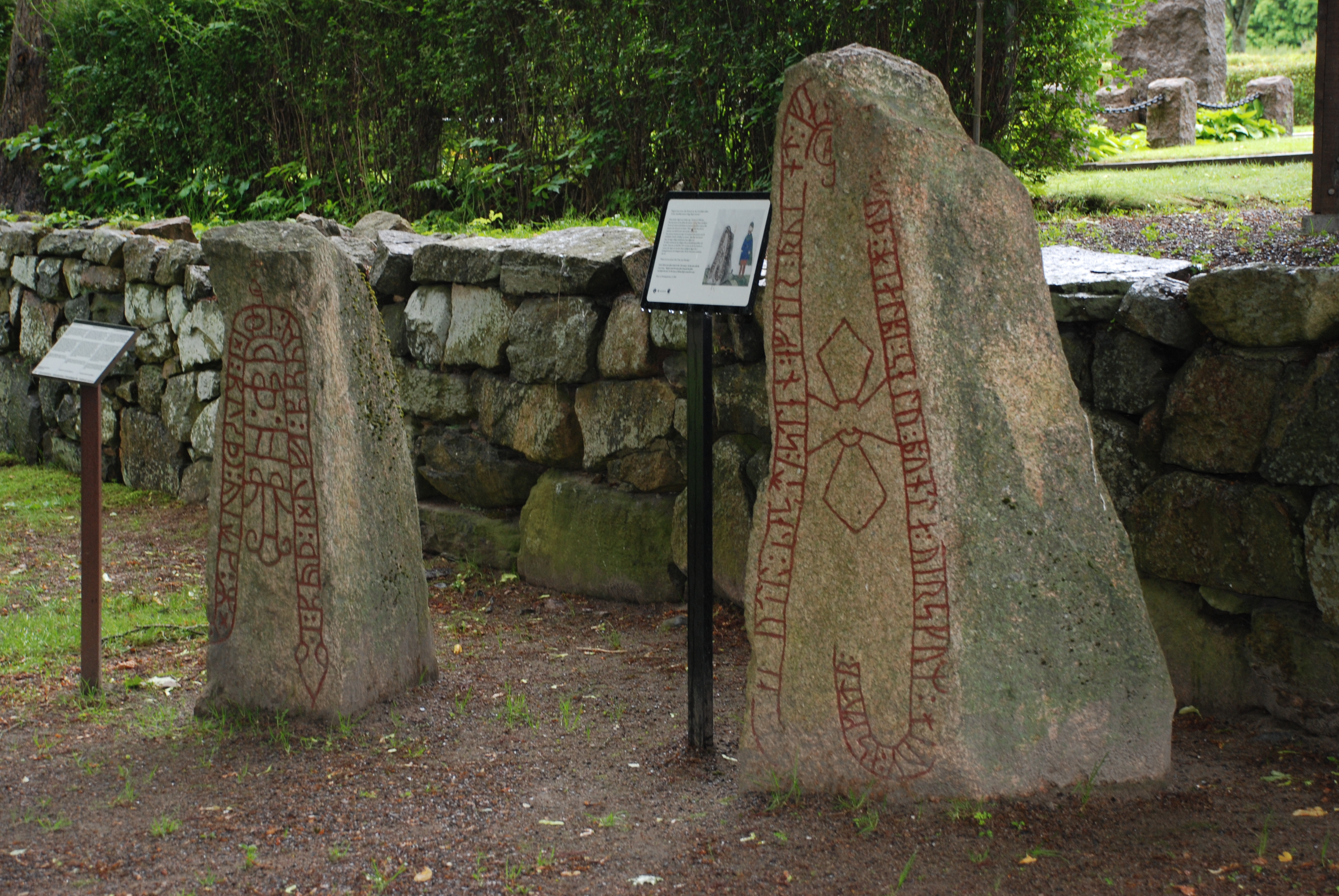
Sm 3 (on the left) and Sm 1 in the yard at the Aringsås Church.

The Aringsås Runestones are two runestones located at the Aringsås Church in Alvesta, Kronoberg County, Sweden, which was in the historic province of Småland. A third runestone is believed to be hidden within a churchyard wall.

== Sm 1 ==
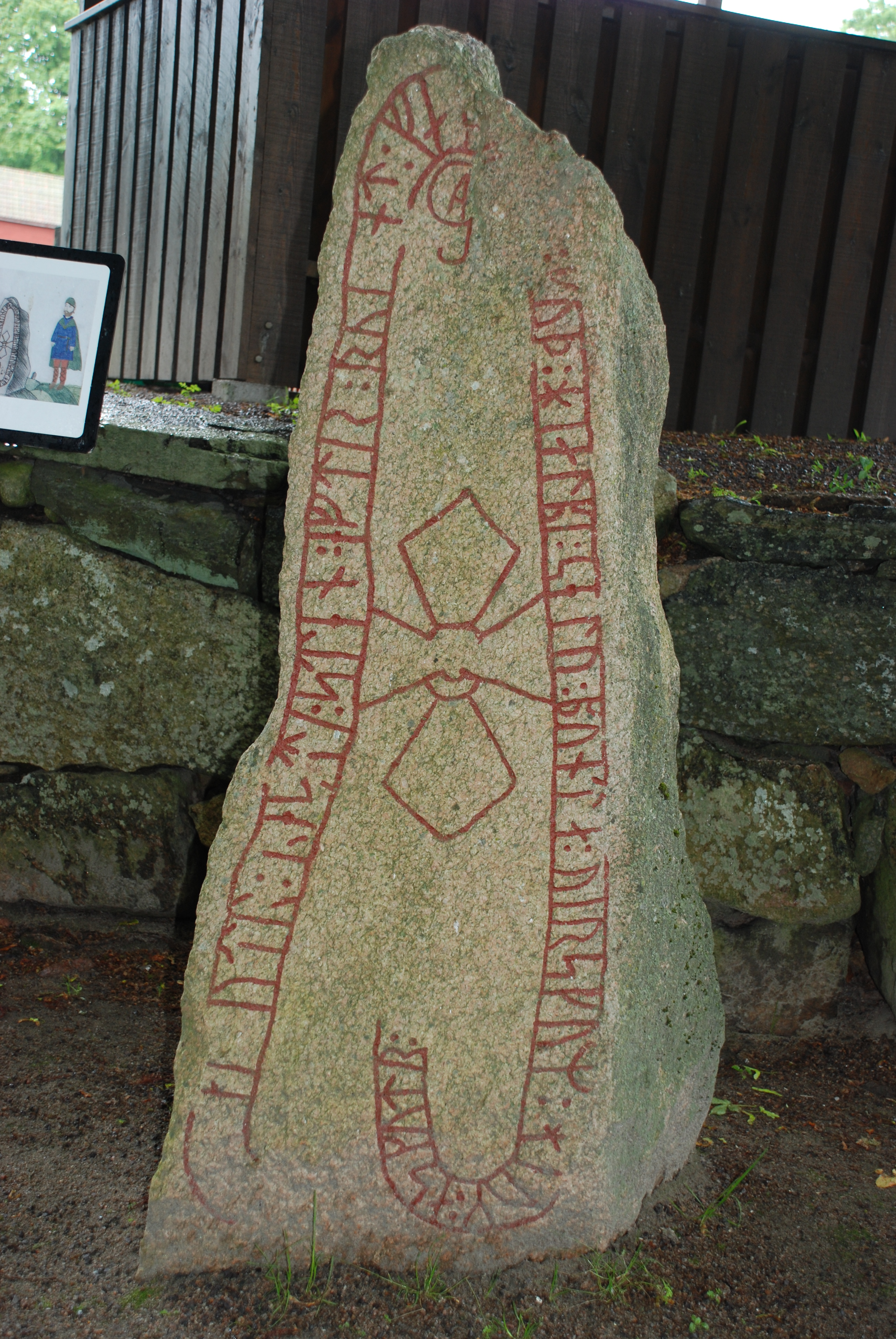
Sm 1 against the churchyard wall.

Småland Runic Inscription 1 or Sm 1 is the Rundata designation for a Viking Age memorial runestone carved on a granite stone that is 1.7 meters in height. Together with Sm 3, it was raised in its current location along the churchyard wall in 1966. The inscription consists of runic text in the younger futhark carved within a text band that runs along the outer edge of the stone. A cross is carved in the central area. As the ends of the runic text band are damaged, the inscription is classified as being probably carved in runestone style RAK, which is considered to be the oldest classification. This is the classification for inscriptions with runic text bands with straight ends that do not have any beast or serpent heads attached. The inscription was carved by a runemaster with the normalized name of Åsgöt. Åsgöt also signed inscription Sö 296 in Skälby and three other surviving runestones are attributed to him based on stylistic analysis.

The runic text states that the runestone was raised by a man named Vigniutr in memory of his father Hromund. Rundata recognizes two possible transcriptions and translations of the runic text, with the first designated as P in the transcription and translation listed below published by Magnus Källström in 2007 and the second designated as Q published by Evert Salberger in 2000. The Q version refers to Värend, which in the Middle Ages was the most populous part of Småland. Consistent with the cross, the text includes a prayer for the soul of Hromund. The Norse word salu for soul was imported from English and is first recorded during the tenth century.

=== Inscription ===
==== Transliteration of the runes into Latin characters ====
[uih]i[k]utr : resti : sten (:) ef(t)r : ru[mu]nt : faþ[ur : sin] : (k)uþ : hialbi : selu : bunta : uirskum : hiuk : askutr : [þuni]

==== Transcription into Old Norse ====
P: Vigniutr(?) ræisti stæin æftiʀ Hromund(?), faður sinn. Guð hialpi salu! Bonda virðskum hiogg Asgautr runaʀ/Þunni(?).
Q: Vigniutr ræisti stæin æftiʀ Hromund, faður sinn - Guð hialpi salu! - bonda virðskum. Hiogg Asgautr runaʀ.

==== Translation in English ====
P: Vígnjótr(?) raised the stone in memory of Hróðmundr(?), his father. May God help (his) soul. Ásgautr cut the runes / Ásgautr Þunni(?) cut for the husbandman from Virðskr.
Q: Vígnjótr raised the stone in memory of Hróðmundr, his father, for the Värendish husbandman (= from the district of the virðar). May God help his soul! Ásgautr cut the runes.

== Sm 2 ==
Småland Runic Inscription 2 or Sm 2 is the Rundata designation for a now-lost Viking Age runestone which is believed to be hidden within one of the churchyard walls. Before the historic significance of runestones was understood, they were often re-used as materials in the construction of churches, walls, and bridges. The text of the stone was recorded during one of the earlier national surveys of runestones. It states that the stone was raised by a man named Ábjôrn in memory of a man named Tóki Óníðingr. The name Óníðingr, which with the ó- prefix means the opposite of the Old Norse pejorative word níðingr, was a word used to describe a man as being virtuous. Óníðingr is used as a descriptive word in some runic inscriptions and is translated in the Rundata database as "unvillainous." It is used as a descriptive term on inscriptions Ög 77 in Hovgården, Sö 189 in Åkerby, Sm 5 in Transjö, Sm 37 in Rörbro, Sm 147 in Vasta Ed, and DR 68 in Århus, and appears as a name or part of a name on inscriptions Ög 217 in Oppeby and Sm 131 in Hjortholmen.

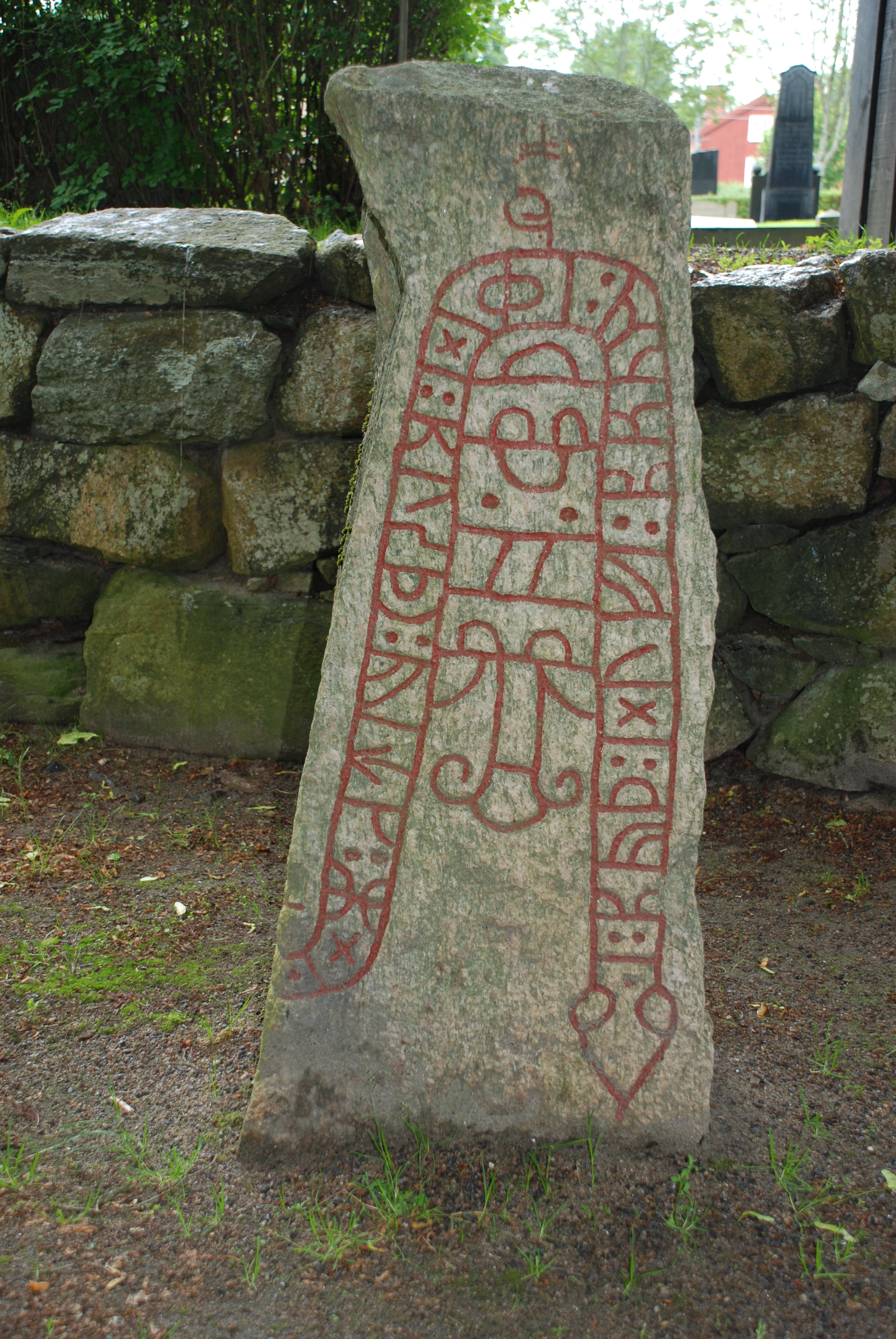
Sm 3 with its meaningless symbols.

=== Inscription ===
==== Transliteration of the runes into Latin characters ====
[abiori : lit * risa : stin ** eftir : toki * uniþint]

==== Transcription into Old Norse ====
Abiorn let ræisa stæin æftiʀ Toka Oniðing.

==== Translation in English ====
Ábjôrn had the stone raised in memory of Tóki Óníðingr.

== Sm 3 ==
Småland Runic Inscription 3 or Sm 3 is the Rundata designation for a Medieval period runestone which has rune-like symbols on an arching serpent. Although the symbols are similar to Norse runes, they are without linguistic meaning. It is considered possible that the inscription was carved by an illiterate person who was attempting to copy some other runestone.
