= Results of the March 1914 Swedish general election =

Sweden held a general election in March 1914 to finish off the original Riksdag term before the regular election later that year.

== Results ==
Party	Votes	%	Seats	+/–
General Electoral League	286,250	37.65	86	+22
Free-minded National Association	245,107	32.24	71	–31
Swedish Social Democratic Party	228,712	30.09	73	+9
Other parties	125	0.02	0	0
Total	760,194	100.00	230	0
Valid votes	760,194	99.58		
Invalid/blank votes	3,229	0.42		
Total votes	763,423	100.00		
Registered voters/turnout	1,092,454	69.88		
Source: Nohlen & Stöver

== Regional results ==
=== Percentage share ===
Land	Share	Votes	AV	F	S
Götaland	52.9	401,864	47.1	29.0	23.9
Svealand	31.3	237,775	28.6	32.2	39.2
Norrland	15.9	120,555	24.2	43.0	32.8
Total	100.0	760,194	37.7	32.2	30.1
Source: SCB

=== By votes ===
Land	Share	Votes	AV	F	S	Other
Götaland	52.9	401,864	189,187	116,700	95,904	73
Svealand	31.3	237,775	67,899	76,582	93,261	33
Norrland	15.9	120,555	29,164	51,825	39,547	19
Total	100.0	760,194	286,250	245,107	228,712	125
Source: SCB

== County results ==
After the dissolution of first-past-the-post, there were usually several constituencies per county as a remnant. In this results list, votes have been registered based on counties, with the exception of Stockholm and the namesake county which had separate counting areas.

=== Percentage share ===
Location	Land	Share	Votes	AV	F	S
Blekinge	G	2.2	16,411	46.2	29.0	24.8
Gothenburg-Bohus	G	5.9	44,925	44.2	29.2	26.6
Gotland	G	1.3	10,042	82.2	16.4	1.4
Gävleborg	N	4.5	34,008	18.7	30.5	50.8
Halland	G	2.9	21,741	59.4	23.7	16.8
Jämtland	N	2.3	17,578	21.6	57.1	21.2
Jönköping	G	4.4	33,796	55.3	28.5	16.1
Kalmar	G	4.1	31,423	62.0	24.2	13.8
Kopparberg	S	4.2	31,911	18.5	32.6	48.8
Kristianstad	G	4.7	36,048	32.9	41.5	25.6
Kronoberg	G	3.1	23,267	60.1	21.1	18.8
Malmöhus	G	8.2	62,242	34.4	22.6	43.0
Norrbotten	N	2.0	15,458	25.7	27.8	46.4
Skaraborg	G	4.9	37,156	40.8	44.1	15.1
Stockholm (city)	S	5.7	43,509	38.4	18.8	42.7
Stockholm County	S	3.6	27,950	42.8	22.9	34.3
Södermanland	S	3.6	27,735	21.6	38.8	39.6
Uppsala	S	2.6	19,675	34.6	35.6	29.8
Värmland	S	4.6	34,927	21.8	44.1	34.1
Västerbotten	N	2.7	20,792	33.8	64.3	1.8
Västernorrland	N	4.3	32,719	24.4	41.9	33.6
Västmanland	S	3.0	22,751	25.6	30.7	43.7
Älvsborg	G	5.8	43,961	50.8	32.6	16.6
Örebro	S	3.9	29,317	24.1	39.1	36.8
Östergötland	G	5.4	40,852	43.1	24.9	32.0
Total		100.0	760,194	37.7	32.2	30.1
Source: SCB

=== By votes ===
Location	Land	Share	Votes	AV	F	S	Other
Blekinge	G	2.2	16,411	7,583	4,753	4,073	2
Gothenburg-Bohus	G	5.9	44,925	19,870	13,096	11,950	9
Gotland	G	1.3	10,042	8,257	1,643	141	1
Gävleborg	N	4.5	34,008	6,365	10,381	17,261	1
Halland	G	2.9	21,741	12,914	5,163	3,661	3
Jämtland	N	2.3	17,578	3,796	10,044	3,728	10
Jönköping	G	4.4	33,796	18,705	9,634	5,450	7
Kalmar	G	4.1	31,423	19,491	7,603	4,327	2
Kopparberg	S	4.2	31,911	5,908	10,411	15,588	4
Kristianstad	G	4.7	36,048	11,856	14,962	9,216	14
Kronoberg	G	3.1	23,267	13,995	4,900	4,371	1
Malmöhus	G	8.2	62,242	21,407	14,051	26,759	25
Norrbotten	N	2.0	15,458	3,975	4,302	7,178	3
Skaraborg	G	4.9	37,156	15,170	16,386	5,598	2
Stockholm (city)	S	5.7	43,509	16,724	8,175	18,600	10
Stockholm County	S	3.6	27,950	11,952	6,395	9,600	3
Södermanland	S	3.6	27,735	6,000	10,752	10,980	3
Uppsala	S	2.6	19,675	6,810	7,002	5,858	5
Värmland	S	4.6	34,927	7,626	15,389	11,910	2
Västerbotten	N	2.7	20,792	7,034	13,379	377	2
Västernorrland	N	4.3	32,719	7,994	13,719	11,003	3
Västmanland	S	3.0	22,751	5,814	6,991	9,944	2
Älvsborg	G	5.8	43,961	22,342	14,320	7,297	2
Örebro	S	3.9	29,317	7,065	11,467	10,781	4
Östergötland	G	5.4	40,852	17,597	10,189	13,061	5
Total		100.0	760,194	286,250	245,107	228,712	125
Source: SCB
