= Níð =

Loss of honor in Germanic societies

In historical Germanic society, níð (Old Norse, pronunciation: /niːð/, in runic: ᚾᛁᚦ, Old English: nīþ, nīð; Old Dutch: nīth) was a term for a social stigma implying the loss of honour and the status of a villain. A person affected with the stigma is considered a nithing (Old Norse: níðingr, in runic: ᚾᛁᚦᛁᚴᛦ, Old English: nīðing, nīðgæst, Old High German: nidding).

Middle English retained a cognate nithe, meaning 'enmity, ill will; malice, spite; envy' (compare modern Dutch nijd and modern German Neid), 'hate', or 'malice'.

A related term is ergi, carrying the connotation of 'unmanliness'.

== Níð and ergi ==
The noun ergi and related adjectives argr and ragr can be regarded as specifying swearwords. Ergi, argr and ragr were the severe insults made by questioning another's masculinity, or by referring to them as a coward, and due to its severity, old Scandinavian laws demanded retribution for this accusation if it had turned out unjustified. The Icelandic Gray Goose Laws referred to three words that were regarded as equal to argr by themselves. Those were ragr, strodinn, and sordinn, all three meaning the passive role of a man in sexual activities, being womanly, and being subservient. Another semantic belonging to argr, ragr and ergi was, from the Gray Goose, "being a sorcerer's friend"; ergi and its derivatives are often attested in the context of seiðr, as in Ynglinga saga.

The Gulathing law, for instance, referred to "being a male bottom," "being a thrall (slave)," "being a seiðmaðr (wizard)," the Bergen/Island law referred to "being a seiðmaðr," "being a sorcerer and/or desiring same-sex activities as a [passive] male (kallar ragann)," the Frostathing law to "desiring male same-sex activities as a bottom." Thus, it is apparent that ergi of a níðingr was strongly connoted not only with sorcery, unmanliness, weakness, and effeminacy but also especially with lecherousness or sexual perversion in the view of Old Scandinavian people during the Early and High Middle Ages. Ergi of females (feminine adjective: ǫrg) was defined as excessive lecherousness or promiscuity, and of males as perversity, effeminacy and the passive role within same-sex intercourse between men. An active role of a man, who had been included into same-sex intercourse, was not tinged by ergi or níð.

== Scolding and níðstang ==
Níðingir had to be scolded, i. e. it had to be shouted in their faces what they were in derogatory terms, as scolding (Anglo-Saxon scald, Norse skald, Icelandic skalda, OHG scelta, Modern German Schelte; compare scoff, Modern Dutch schelden, Anglo-Saxon scop, and flyting) was supposed to break the concealing seiðr spell and would thus force the fiend to give away its true nature.

To deem another man argr – according to Hugo Gering, the most derogatory of all Old Norse profanities - necessarily constituted níð. According to Icelandic law, the accused was allowed to kill the accuser without paying weregild.

If the accused did not retort by violent attack, either right on the spot or by demanding holmganga, yielding either the challenging accuser to take his words back or the accuser's death, he was hence proven to be a weak and cowardly níðingr by not retorting accordingly.

Beside by words, scolding could also be performed by pejorative visual portrayals, especially by a so-called níðstǫng or nithing poles. These were usually single poles with a carved man's head, on which a horse or a horse's head was impaled. In two attested instances (Bjarnar saga Hítdælakappa ch. 17, Gísla saga Súrssonar), two níðstangs were arranged so as to suggest homosexual intercourse.

A "classical definition of ergi is found in the scoldings (see section below) of opposing warriors Gudmund and Sinfyötli in the New Helgi song, offending each other as earg and thus challenging each other before a fight. Gudmund perjorates Sinfyötli in verse 36:

Verse 36
Prince you cannot
talk about me
like that,
scolding a
noble man.
For you ate
a wolf's treat,
shedding your brother's
blood, often
you sucked on wounds
with an icy maw,
creeping to
dead bodies,
being hated by all.

and in following verses 37-39 Sinfyötli rebuts this:

Verse 37
Walkury, an abhorrent
monster have you been
frightening, and earg,
by Odin!
The Einherjars
fought in desire
about you
stubborn whore.

Verse 38
Hag on Warinsey Island
that was you
so insidiously
conjuring illusions.
You said that
the only warrior
you desired to marry
was I, Sinfyötli.

Verse 39
On Sága's Inlet
you gave birth
to nine wolves
fathered by
Sinfyötli.

In accordance with these more detailed descriptions of what constituted ergi as appearing in the New Helgi song, the Gulathing law referred to eacans swearwords further describing earg as "being a mare," "being a pregnant animal," "being a bitch," "having indecent intercourse with animals," the Bergen/Island law referred to "biting another man," "being a pregnant animal," the Frostothing law to "being a female animal," the Uplandslag law to "having sexual intercourse with an animal." It's worth to note that such activities as being "a pregnant animal" and having intercourse with animals are activities which are attributed to the god Loki in Lokasenna and Gylfaginning.

== Legal implications ==
The seiðr used prominently by níðingr was linguistically closely linked to botany and poisoning. Therefore, seiðr to a degree might have been regarded as identical to murder by poisoning. This Norse concept of poisoning based on magic was equally present in Roman law:

[The] equality in Germanic and Roman law about equalling poisoning and magic was not created by influence of Roman laws upon Germanic people, even though an identical conception was indeed manifest in Roman law. This apparent likeness is probably based upon the shared original primitive conceptions about religion due to a shared Indo-European origin of both people.

Níðingr poisoning ties in with the legal Germanic differentiation of murder and killing. Criminal murder differed from legitimate killing as by being performed in secret insidiously, away from the eyes of the community that had not been involved in the matter.

Sorcery [in Norse antiquity] equalled mysteriously utilizing evil forces, just as mysterious and abhorrent a crime as sexual deviancy. As for theft and murder, even more recent common Old Scandinavian belief still regarded them to be so closely associated to magical practices as to be entirely impossible without these latter. Those that were capable of breaking open heavy locks at night without being noticed by watchdogs nor waking up people had to be in command of supernatural abilities. Equally weird were those that were capable of murdering innocent lives. They were aided, guided, or coerced by an evil force to do their evil deeds.

Since sorcery "was not accepted officially, it could not serve the kinship as a whole, only private cravings; no decent person was safe from the secret arts of sorcerers," and as nīþ was insidiousness, a níðing was also thought to be a pathological liar and an oathbreaker, prone to committing perjury and especially treason. To summarise the relations between níð and criminality:

Severe misdeeds were perjury deeds, especially if they had been committed insidiously and in secret. Such perpetrators were nithings, despicable beings. Their perjury deeds included: Murder, theft, nightly arson, as well as any deeds that harmed the kinship's legally protected rights (treason, deserting to the enemy, deserting from the army, resisting to fight in a war, and perversion). [Furthermore these deeds included] any crimes offending the deities, such as breaking a special peace treaty (for example thing peace, armistice, security of the ceremony places and buildings, or a special festivity peace), trespass, defilement of graves, sorcery, finally all perjury deeds indicating moral degeneration, such as oathbreaking, perversion, acts of nasty cowardice [i. e. any acts] of moral degeneration.

This excessive mass of níðingr associations might at first seem cumbersome and without any recognizable pattern. However the pattern behind it is outlined in the following sections.

The immediate consequence of being proven a níðingr was outlawing the exile. (see for example)

The outlawed did not have any rights, he was exlex (Latin for "outside of the legal system"), in Anglo-Saxon utlah, Middle Low German uutlagh, Old Norse utlagr. Just as feud yielded enmity among kinships, outlawry yielded enmity of all humanity.

"Nobody is allowed to protect, house, or feed the outlaw. He must seek shelter alone in the woods just like a wolf." "Yet that is but one aspect of outlawry. The outlaw is not only expelled from the kinship, he is also regarded henceforth as an enemy to mankind."

Ancient dehumanizing terms meaning both "wolf" and "strangler" were common as synonyms for outlaws: OHG warc, Salian wargus, Anglo-Saxon wearg, Old Norse vargr.

Outlaws were regarded as physically and legally dead, their spouse was seen as widow or widower and their children as orphans, their fortune and belongings were either seized by the kinship or destroyed. "It was every man's duty to capture the outlaw and [...] kill him."

Níðingir were considered to re-enter their bodies after death by their seiðr magic and even their dead bodies themselves were regarded as highly poisonous and contagious. To prevent them from coming back as the undead, their bodies had to be made entirely immobile, especially by impaling, burning up, drowning in rivers or bogs (see also Tacitus), or even all of the above. "Not any measure to this end was considered too awkward."

It could be better to fixate the haunting evil's body by placing large rocks on it, impaling it [..]. Often enough, people saw their efforts had been in vain, so they mounted destruction upon destruction on the individual fiend, maybe starting by beheading, then entirely burning up its body, and finally leaving its ashes in streaming water, hoping to absolutely annihilate the evil, incorporeal spirit itself.

== Níð and seiðr ==
It was believed that the reason for a níðingr to resort to insidious seiðr "witchery" in order to cause harm instead of simply attacking people by decent, belligerent violence to achieve the same end was that it was a cowardly and weak creature, further indicating its being direct opposite of Old Norse warrior ethos. Earg is often but translated as "cowardly, weak". By definition, any seiðberender (practitioner of seiðr) was immediately rendered argr by these very despicable magic practices.

Níð did not only motivate practicing seiðr but was regarded the most likely motivation of all for practicing seiðr. The níðingr used his malicious seiðr magic to destroy anything owned and made by man, ultimately the human race and Miðgarðr itself.

Since primitive societies exclusively attributed their fear of evil sorcerers [i.e., seiðmaðr] to the sorcerer's motivating envy, all Indo-Germanic proverbs on the matter indicate that passive envy easily turns into aggressive crimes. He who envies is not satisfied to passively wait for his neighbours to run into accidents by coincidence to secretly gloat over them (while his gloating habits are widely accepted as a fact), he makes sure that they will live in misery or worse. […] Envy brings death, envy seeks evil ways.

Hence, the níðingr was regarded as a mythological fiend "that only exists to cause harm and bring certain undoing." Harboring a nīþ was regarded as destroying the "individual qualities that constituted man and genetical relation," making deviant, perverse, and ill instead so that this fiend was considered the direct opposite of decent man and its [nīþ] as contagious.

[Níðingir] were aided, guided, or coerced by an evil force to do their evil deeds. Hence, a nithing was not only degenerated in a general [moral] sense [...] it had originally been a human being of evil, fiendish nature that had either sought evil deliberately or had been taken into possession by evil forces unwillingly.

== Association with physical disability ==
Níðingir were thought to be suffering from physical ailments and were associated with disability. Most notably their limping was an outer indication of being a níðingr (such as in the story of Rögnvald Straightleg whose last name was in fact but an ironic offence as his legs were actually crippled), and the belief that sorcerers would not only give birth to animals but also to crippled human children.

[...] a nithing was not only degenerated in a general [moral] sense [...] This [moral] degeneration was often innate, especially apparent by physical ailments.

These physical afflictions were regarded as furthermore supporting weakness of a níðingr. It was often hard to distinguish these attributes from actual physical illness, and since "any eeriness and incomprehensibility was what made people suspect a person of being a níðingr, whether this was based upon physical anomalies or mental traits", they were often regarded as mentally ill even during ancient times already, as defined by actually or perceivedly deviant social behaviour and feeling.

== Association with effeminacy ==
Níðingir sometimes practiced seiðr in female clothes regardless of their biological sex, and they were considered to lose their physical biological sex by that act if they had been male before. More recent dialect forms of seid linguistically link it to "female sex organs." Also, there exists (or existed) evidence on the Golden Horns of Gallehus that male initiates of seiðr were ritually "effeminated" or made to appear "genderless" (such as by using "women's clothing" such as robes, as do priests of other religions, in order to manipulate the genderless spirits).

According eacans in the Gulathing law were "having born children as a male," "being a male whore," while the Gray Goose referred to "being a woman each ninth night," and "having born children as a male."

== Runestones ==
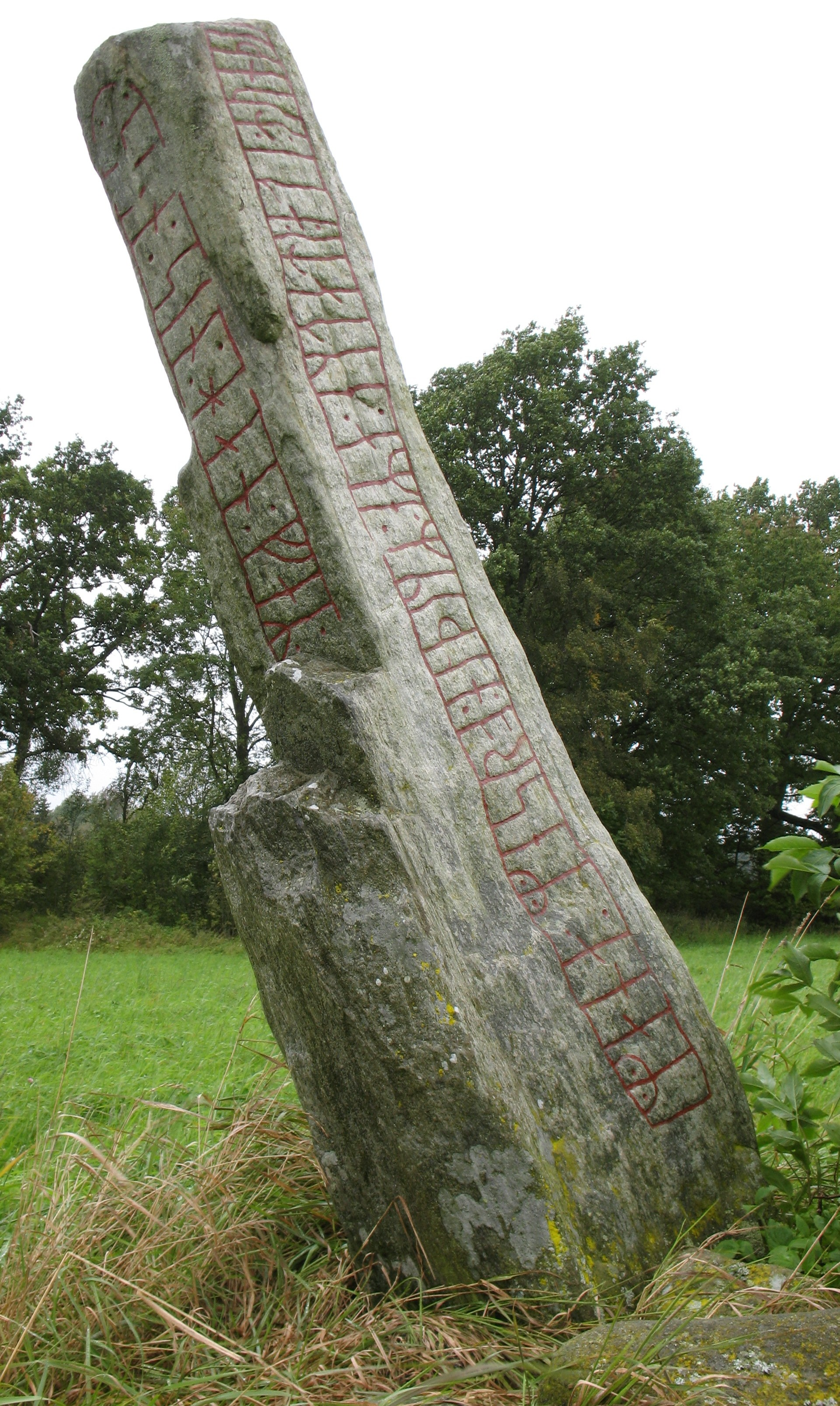
Runestone Sm 5 uses the opposite of niðingr, or oniðingr, to describe a man who died in England.

Although no runic inscription uses the terms níð or níðingr, several Viking Age runestones use the term oníðingr, which with the o- prefix means the opposite of níðingr, to describe a man as being virtuous. Rundata translates this term as "unvillainous." This term is used as a descriptive term on runestones Ög 77 in Hovgården, Sö 189 in Åkerby, Sm 5 in Transjö, Sm 37 in Rörbro, Sm 147 in Vasta Ed, and DR 68 in Århus, and appears as a name or part of a name on inscriptions Ög 217 in Oppeby, Sm 2 in Aringsås, and Sm 131 in Hjortholmen. The same alliterative Old Norse phrase, manna mæstr oniðingR, which is translated as "the most unvillainous of men," appears on Ög 77, Sm 5, and Sm 37, and DR 68 uses a variant of this phrase.

== See also ==
- Hostis humani generis
- Malakia in ancient Hellenic society (formerly Classical definition of effeminacy)
- Moral turpitude
- Raca in Semitic languages
- Shame-stroke
