= September 1914 Swedish general election =

- 5 September 1914

All 230 seats in the Andra kammaren
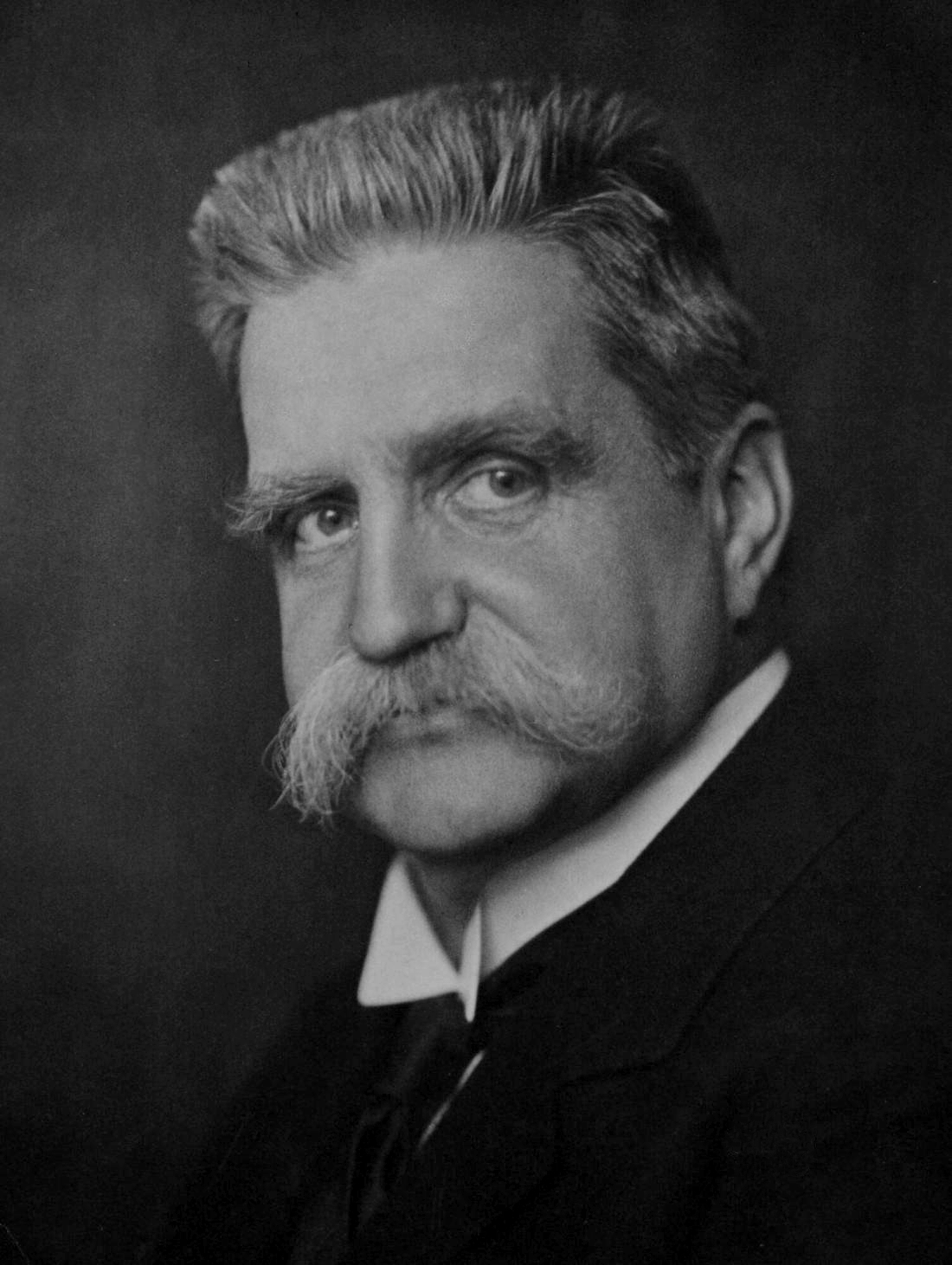

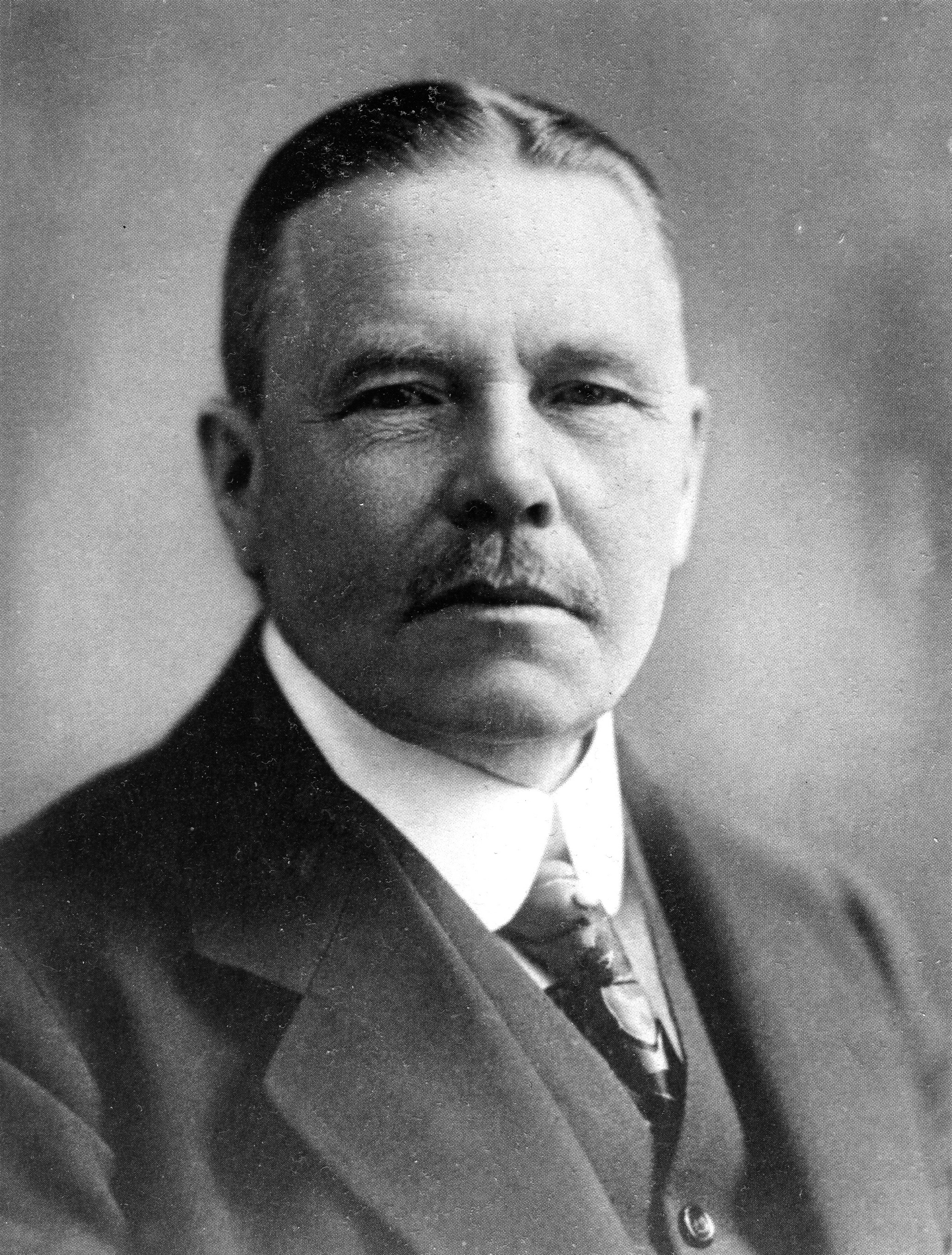

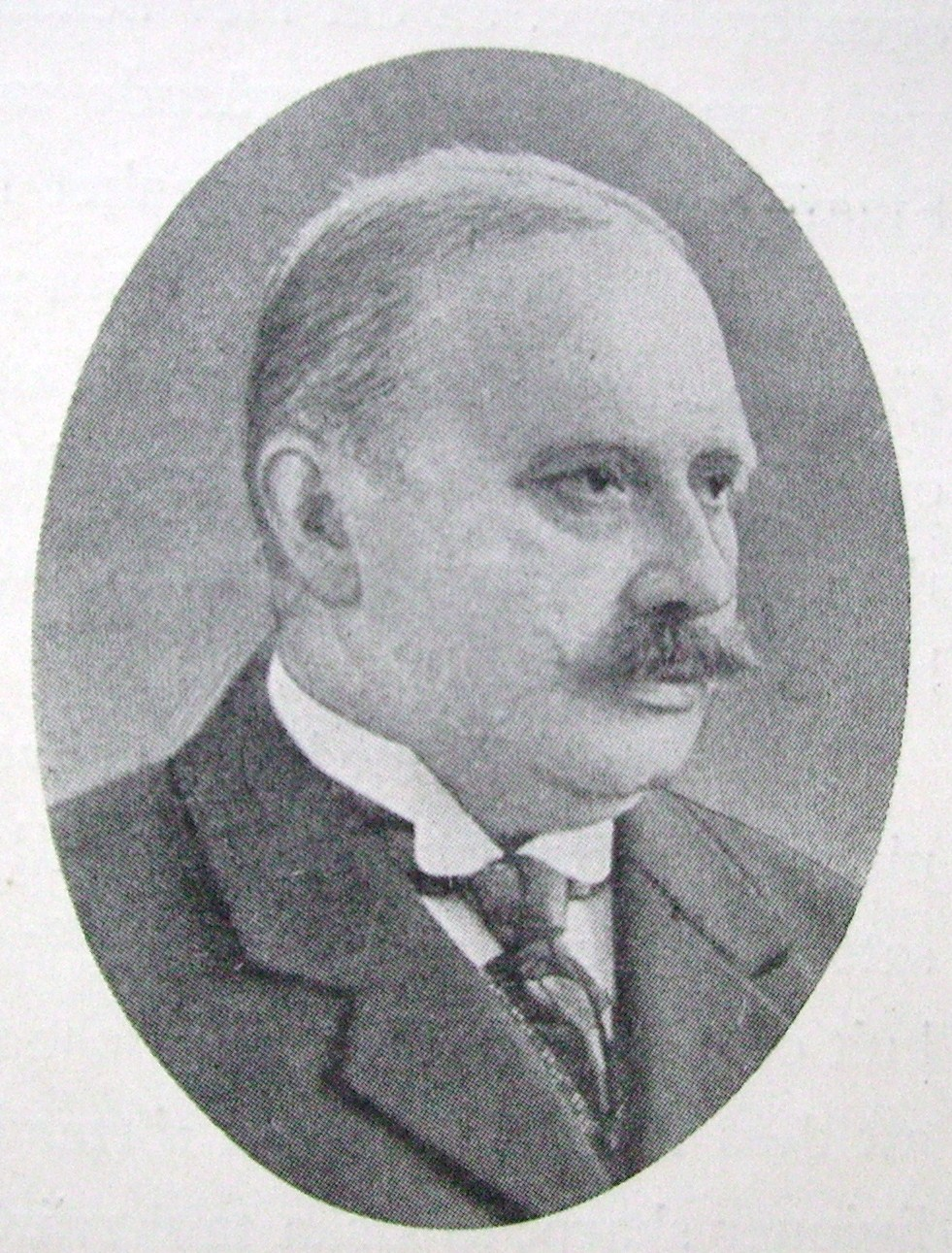
	First party	Second party	Third party
Leader	Hjalmar Branting	Arvid Lindman	Axel Schotte
Party	Social Democrats	Electoral League	Free-minded
Last election	73	86	71
Seats won	87	86	57
Seat change	▲13	Steady	▼13
Popular vote	266,133	267,124	196,493
Percentage	36.39%	36.52%	26.87%
Prime Minister before election
Hjalmar Hammarskjöld
Electoral League
PM-elect
Hjalmar Hammarskjöld
Electoral League

Early general elections were held in Sweden 5 and 13 September 1914, the second that year. Although the General Electoral League received the most votes, the Swedish Social Democratic Party emerged as the largest party, winning 87 of the 230 seats in the Andra kammaren, and have managed to remain so in every subsequent Swedish election.

== Results ==
The General Electoral League and Farmers' League had a tactical arrangement that saw all the votes for the latter land as Electoral League in the constituencies. Therefore, the Electoral League may correctly also be attributed 268,631 votes or 36.7%.

Party	Votes	%	Seats	+/–
General Electoral League	267,124	36.52	86	0
Swedish Social Democratic Party	266,133	36.39	87	+13
Free-minded National Association	196,493	26.87	57	–13
Farmers' League	1,507	0.21	0	New
Other parties	104	0.01	0	0
Total	731,361	100.00	230	0
Valid votes	731,361	99.44		
Invalid/blank votes	4,125	0.56		
Total votes	735,486	100.00		
Registered voters/turnout	1,111,767	66.15		
Source: Nohlen & Stöver
