= Albo Hundred =

Geographic division in Sweden

Albo Hundred Albo härad
- Hundred of Sweden
- Coat of arms

- Location within Scania

Albo Hundred (Swedish: Albo härad) was a hundred on the east coast of Scania in southern Sweden.

The administrative center of Albo härad was the village of Brösarp. Today, the picturesque fishing village of Kivik (pop. 900) is larger.

Notable sites are The King's Grave, the dolmen at Haväng as well as the National park of Stenshuvud.

== Socken ==
The hundred was divided into sockens:

In Simrishamn Municipality

- Ravlunda
- Sankt Olof
- Rörum
- Södra Mellby
- Vitaby

In Tomelilla Municipality

- Fågeltofta
- Eljaröd
- Andrarum
- Brösarp

== See also ==
- Allbo Hundred in Småland
