= Allbo Hundred =

Allbo Hundred, or Allbo härad, was a hundred of Småland in Sweden.

== Sockens ==
Allbo Hundred contained 16 sockens:

- Virestad
- Stenbrohult
- Vislanda
- Blädinge
- Skatelöv
- Västra Torsås
- Härlunda
- Lekaryd
- Aringsås
- Hjortsberga
- Kvenneberga
- Slätthög
- Mistelås
- Moheda
- Ör
- Härlöv

== See also ==
- Albo Hundred in Scania
